Supernatural is an American television drama series created by writer and producer Eric Kripke. It was initially broadcast by The WB network from September 13, 2005, but after the first season, the WB and UPN networks merged to form The CW network, which was the final broadcaster for the show in the United States by the series' conclusion on November 19, 2020, with 327 episodes aired. The Winchesters, a spin-off prequel/sequel series to Supernatural developed by Robbie Thompson, Jensen Ackles and Danneel Ackles, premiered on The CW from October 11, 2022.

Supernatural and The Winchesters each feature two main characters, Sam Winchester (played by Jared Padalecki) and Dean Winchester (played by Jensen Ackles), and Mary Campbell (played by Meg Donnelly) and John Winchester (played by Drake Rodger). 

In Supernatural, the two Winchester brothers are hunters who travel across the United States, mainly to the Midwest, in a black 1967 Chevy Impala to hunt demons, werewolves, vampires, ghosts, witches, and other supernatural creatures. Supernatural chronicles the relationship between the brothers, their friends, and their father. Throughout the seasons, the brothers work to fight evil, keep each other alive, and avenge those they have lost. In The Winchesters, Dean Winchester narrates the story of how his parents John Winchester and Mary Campbell met, fell in love and fought monsters together while in search for their missing fathers.

Supernatural features many recurring guests that help Sam Winchester and Dean Winchester with their hunts and quests. Frequent returning characters include hunter Bobby Singer (who becomes a father figure to Sam and Dean after season two), Castiel (an angel), Crowley (a demon and the King of Hell), and Jack Kline (the Nephilim). The series also featured recurring appearances from other angels, demons, and hunters.

Cast

Main

Recurring

Notable guests

 Notes

Angels

Angels of God are extremely powerful spiritual beings. Merely perceiving their true form - even psychically - typically results in blindness, as the appearance of their natural "visage" is overwhelming. Only a select few can withstand their true appearances and voices, though no one is ever featured on the show that could do so. They often take human vessels to exist in and interact with the physical world; however, they can only enter with the hosts' consent. Angels need a particular vessel called the "chosen" one or "true vessels" to be their host if they want to reach their full potential.

Most angels are portrayed as emotionless authoritarian beings. Some angels show disdain for humanity, noting that humans are flawed and inferior creations. Lucifer was the only angel to refuse kneeling before humans at God's command. All angels, fallen or not, refer to each other as siblings and refer to God as their Father. However, most angels never actually meet or talk to God. God, their former leader, is noted as missing throughout the majority of the show, leaving the angels to protect humanity instead. There is a ranking among the angels, with the higher ranks commanding those at a lower rank.

Creator Eric Kripke originally did not want angels to be featured in the series, believing God worked through hunters rather than angels. However, with so many demon villains, he and the writers changed their minds when they realized that the show needed angels to create a "cosmic battle" between the angels and demons. As Kripke put it, "We had the empire, but we didn't really have the rebellion." They wanted to have a storyline with a few central characters, but with the massive battles in the background, comparable to Star Wars and The Lord of the Rings, the addition of angels allowed for this. Kripke eventually found that it opened up new storylines to include in the show.

Demons
Demons in the series are generally portrayed as cruel and sadistic, often taking pleasure in causing humans pain. They are also, as series creator Eric Kripke deemed them, "erudite and sophisticated". While the demon "tyrant" Azazel commands them in the first two seasons, demons were the sole antagonists of the third season. At times, their culture is compared to normal humans, with the third-season episode "Sin City" introducing their religious side. Many believe Lucifer was their own higher power. Though many demons came to lose faith, they followed the fallen angel upon his release from Hell in the fifth season.

Inspirations for these types of demons came from numerous sources, such as the devil-on-your-shoulder concept used in the episode "Sin City". The writers often tried to base the demons on actual aspects of history, as was done in "Malleus Maleficarum" by having the demon Tammi turn a group of women into witches. An encyclopedia on demons was used for research, with Binsfield's Classification of Demons inspiring "The Magnificent Seven's" storyline of seven demons being the physical embodiment of the Seven Deadly Sins.

The writers originally intended for demons to not rely on human hosts, but rather exist "halfway between spirits and corporeal creatures." However, the demon in "Phantom Traveler" demonstrates the ability to possess people. This quality and its other characteristics were chosen without foresight solely to fit with the episode's storyline, and the writers opted to maintain it as an element of all demons. Kripke felt it added an interesting aspect to the storylines, as the viewers "never quite know who the bad guy is". Another source of debate for the writers stemmed from the demons' eye color, which is based on a demon's place in the hierarchy. The writers preferred to limit unique colors to only the "big, big, bad guys". Writer Sera Gamble noted, "If every time we had a demon that was powerful we gave them a different eye color, pretty soon it'd be like, 'The Chartreuse-Eyed Demon is coming for us!'" During the production of the second season, Kripke viewed the horror film I Walked with a Zombie, and found one of the creatures having all-white eyes to be "really disturbing". The writers considered changing the eye color of regular demons to white, but eventually decided against it. However, Kripke later used the idea when Lilith and other high-level demons were introduced.

The appearance of a demons' true form became more complex as the series progressed. Originally depicted as small, thin streams of black smoke, demons began to appear as large, thick smoke clouds. When in large groups, the clouds have electricity pulsing throughout them. The visual effects department based the demons' shape on that of a snake, giving it a "predatorial" and "intelligent" look. Visual effects supervisor Ivan Hayden found demon smoke to be one of the hardest visual effects in the series.

Abaddon
Primarily portrayed by actress Alaina Huffman, Abaddon is the last remaining Knight of Hell, a class of mighty demons who were among the first of their kind. Abaddon is too strong to be affected by exorcisms or to be killed by Ruby's knife. She is introduced in the eighth-season episode "As Time Goes By" in which she is sent to destroy the Men of Letters organization in 1958 and sets off in pursuit of Sam and Dean's grandfather, Henry Winchester, who escaped with the key to the Men of Letters' bunker. Wanting to break into the bunker to gain access to the powerful supernatural spells and artifacts inside, Abaddon follows Henry through time to the present and hunts him and his grandsons throughout the episode. As a result, she holds Sam hostage to force Dean to hand over Henry and the key, promising to let Sam and Dean go after the trade. Abaddon goes back on her agreement and ends up mortally wounding Henry, but not before he shoots her in the head with a bullet engraved with a devil's trap, binding her powers and her to her now-paralyzed host body. Sam and Dean then cut her up and bury her in cement to forever entomb her. In "Clip Show", Sam and Dean need a demon to cure for the third trial to close the gates of Hell, so they sew Abaddon back together to use her, without reattaching her hands or removing the bullet. Abaddon reveals that she had been sent to kill the priest who found a way to cure demons, and that while torturing him, she found out about the Men of Letters (including her host Josie Sands) from him. This ultimately resulted in her possessing Josie and attacking the Men of Letters. While Sam and Dean take a phone call from Crowley outside, Abaddon frees herself and escapes by controlling one of her severed hands and using it to remove the bullet from her skull. In the following episode, the season finale "Sacrifice", she arrives in response to Crowley's distress call but attacks him rather than help him. Abaddon declares her intention of taking over Hell, only to be driven away when Sam sets her ablaze in holy fire.

Abaddon returns in the ninth season, her objectives to kill Crowley, become the Queen of Hell, and "turn all of humankind into her demon army." With Crowley being largely absent from Hell and having been deeply affected by the incomplete demon cure forced on him by the Winchesters, the intimidating Abaddon ends up winning the nearly unanimous support of the other demons. In "First Born", Crowley and Dean go to her maker, teacher, and former lover, Cain, to get his Mark. The Mark of Cain makes it possible to wield the First Blade, the only weapon capable of killing Abaddon. Cain reveals that Abaddon, after failing to persuade him to rejoin her, had tricked him into murdering his beloved human wife Colette. He made a promise to Colette, making him unable to seek revenge directly, so he gives Dean the Mark so that Dean can kill Abaddon once Crowley finds the Blade.

The episode "Mother's Little Helper" reveals that Abaddon's history with the Men of Letters goes back further than previously thought. Abaddon had been confronted by Henry and Josie when stealing people's souls at a convent before her slaughter of the Men of Letters. She intended to possess Henry to spy on the Men of Letters before destroying them, but accepted Josie's offer and possessed her instead, all without Henry's knowledge.

In the present, Abaddon gives the order for her minions to begin stealing souls again to build an army of demons loyal to her. In an attempt to eliminate all threats posed to her and her rule, Abaddon concocts a plan to kill Crowley and the Winchesters and destroy the First Blade. She brings Crowley's human son Gavin forward in time and tortures him until Crowley agrees to help her set up a trap for Sam and Dean. In an attempt to destroy them all at once, Abaddon sends Crowley to the Winchesters to retrieve the First Blade and then lead them to her. Crowley manages to double-cross Abaddon and warn Dean of the trap, but he is unable to restrain her. Abaddon ends up shooting Crowley with a devil's trap bullet, preventing him from interfering in the upcoming fight. Before she can enact the rest of her plan and kill Crowley, Gavin, and the Winchesters, she is slain by Dean wielding the First Blade. Following Abaddon's death, most demons go back to following Crowley. Those that remained loyal to Abaddon tried to ambush Dean following their leader's death in "Black" only to be easily killed themselves.

Executive producer and series writer Adam Glass revealed on Twitter that Abaddon was inspired by Lauren Bacall, an actress whom he admires. Showrunner Jeremy Carver went into the character's motivation, explaining that Abaddon was "appalled" to find that Crowley ruled over Hell because she "loves Hell and what it represents." He believed that the contrasts in the two characters' views incited "a nice conflict to our demon world."

Abraxas
Abraxas, portrayed by Nelson Leis in season 14, is the powerful and sadistic black-eyed demon who murdered the family of Lucifer's future vessel Nick.

Abraxas is briefly mentioned, though not by name, in season 5's "Sympathy for the Devil" when Lucifer mentions the brutal murders of Nick's family to manipulate him into consenting to possession.

In season 14's "Gods and Monsters", Nick learns that his family's murders are still unsolved after nine years and seeks revenge, starting with Arty Nielson, his neighbor who witnessed a man running out of Nick's house on the night of the murders. In "Unhuman Nature", Nick tracks down Frank Kellogg, the police officer Abraxas possessed on the night of the murders. Frank tells Nick that Nick's wife, Sarah, had called the police to report a prowler, and when Frank investigated, he found Abraxas outside. After introducing himself, Abraxas possessed Frank and brutally beat Sarah and Nick's son, Teddy, to death with a hammer. Nick remembers that Lucifer knew the name Abraxas and realizes that a demon killed his family, but still murders Frank regardless.

In "Damaged Goods", Nick captures, tortures, and murders demons in search of Abraxas. Nick finally captures a demon who worked with Abraxas to kill almost an entire Girl Scout troop. The demon reveals that Abraxas was captured by Sam and Dean Winchester's mother, Mary Winchester. After receiving the information, Nick kills the demon and goes to find Mary. Nick kidnaps Mary and forces her to admit that when she couldn't defeat Abraxas, she trapped him in an Enochian puzzle box. Nick forces Mary to lead him to the storage unit where the puzzle box is located and kidnaps a security guard named Jeff to act as Abraxas' vessel. While possessing Jeff, Abraxas is trapped by a devil's trap. Abraxas offers to tell Nick what he wants to know if Nick murders Mary. The Winchesters and Sheriff Donna Hanscum interrupt, causing Nick to break the devil's trap and free Abraxas. Abraxas reveals to Nick that Lucifer ordered him to commit the murders and Abraxas had chosen him by throwing a dart at the phone book. Dean attempts an exorcism, but Abraxas stops him. While Abraxas is distracted, Nick approaches from behind and kills Abraxas with an angel blade.

Alastair

Anthony
Appearing in season 13 and portrayed by Bianca Carioca, Anthony is a demon described by Lucifer as "a minor player. Total nobody getting a day rate."

Anthony appears in "Bring 'em Back Alive", where he possesses a teenage girl. In a scene reminiscent of The Exorcist, two priests tie Anthony to a bed and attempt to exorcise him from the girl ineptly. Shaking the bed, Anthony taunts the two priests over their own vices while they mistake him for Satan and call for him to leave the girl. Having overheard the attempted exorcism, the real Lucifer shows up. Annoyed that the priests have mistaken Anthony for him and by Anthony's antics, Lucifer questions Anthony regarding his choices. Anthony argues that he's "just having a little fun." Completely fed up with the demon, Lucifer calls him an idiot and exorcises Anthony with a snap of his fingers. As Anthony returns to Hell, Lucifer orders him not to come back. Though Anthony is exorcised, the girl does not survive due to the body damage inflicted on her when she was possessed.

Ardat
Ardat, portrayed by Sharon Taylor, is a powerful black-eyed demon who hated Belphegor, aware that the other demon wanted to take power in Hell.

In "Raising Hell", Ardat is first mentioned by Arthur Ketch when he reveals that he was hired to assassinate Belphegor. Belphegor appears to be unsurprised by Ardat's move and Arthur states that Ardat had called Belphegor "a monstrous threat to humanity." As Belphegor is working with the Winchesters to stop the ghosts and demons who have escaped from Hell, Arthur chooses not to go through with trying to kill Belphegor and assumes that she was wrong or simply lying.

In "The Rupture", possessing a doctor at a hospital, Ardat kills a nurse and confronts a recovering Arthur over his failure to follow through on assassinating Belphegor. Arthur attempts to kill Ardat with an angel blade, but is effortlessly overpowered. After confirming that Arthur will not betray his friends for anything, Ardat brutally rips out Arthur's still-beating heart and crushes it, killing him. Using Arthur's cell phone to pose as him, she then contacts Dean and learns of the Winchesters' plan, which involves returning to Hell. In Hell, as Belphegor and Castiel recover Lilith's Crook, Ardat attacks, knowing Belphegor's true intentions and intending to stop him at all costs. Castiel battles Ardat but proves to be no match for the demon who warns him that Belphegor is only using him to get power in Hell. While Ardat is distracted by Castiel, Belphegor kills her from behind with an angel blade and confirms to Castiel, who has been suspicious of the demon's motives all along, that she was telling the truth. Castiel subsequently kills Belphegor before he can succeed. After the world is saved, Dean reports Arthur's death to Sam along with the fact that it was probably a demon who did it, though they are unaware that it was Ardat.

Asmodeus
First mentioned in season 12's "Stuck in the Middle (With You)", Asmodeus is a demon and one of the four Princes of Hell alongside Azazel, Ramiel, and Dagon. Like Ramiel and Dagon, Asmodeus is stated to have left Hell a long time ago, having lost interest in Lucifer's plans in favor of his "hobbies." Both Lucifer and Gabriel describe him as the weakest of the Princes of Hell. Lucifer also implies that Asmodeus is the youngest of the Princes of Hell.

Asmodeus (portrayed primarily by Jeffrey Vincent Parise) first appears in season 13's "The Rising Son." Appearing in Crowley's former palace, Asmodeus announces himself as the new King of Hell to all of the gathered demons with a stated intention to rule until Lucifer or his Nephilim son Jack can be found to replace him. Displaying immense powers, Asmodeus quickly begins reshaping Hell to his standards, summarily executing several demons that fail to meet those standards. Asmodeus uses his shapeshifting abilities to get close to the Winchesters and Jack. Disguised as the Prophet Donatello Redfield, Asmodeus manipulates Jack into opening a portal to release the Shedim, creatures that even Lucifer fears. After Asmodeus is exposed, he is forced to retreat by an enraged Jack.

In "War of the Worlds", Asmodeus uses his powers to search for Jack while also interrogating those who have seen the Winchesters. Asmodeus senses Lucifer's return from the Apocalypse World and finds Lucifer and Castiel together in a bar. Recognizing his "father's" weakened state, Asmodeus announces an intention to keep power for himself in Hell and imprisons Lucifer and Castiel. He then hires Arthur Ketch, a former member of the British Men of Letters and a skilled assassin, to help him search for Jack. To keep the Winchesters from finding out that Castiel has been captured, Asmodeus impersonates Castiel on a phone call to trick them. Asmodeus contacts the Winchesters in this way for a few episodes to both keep them off of his trail and see if they have learned anything about Jack's location. Lucifer and Castiel later manage to escape in "Various & Sundry Villains" while Asmodeus is away.

In "The Scorpion and The Frog", Asmodeus learns of the Crossroads Demon Barthamus' plans to attack Luther Shrike's home and retrieve the trunk containing Barthamus' human bones. Wanting to get rid of the traitor, Asmodeus sends a demonic messenger to warn Luther and ask to tip him off if Barthamus arrives. Luther refuses to help Asmodeus and exorcises the messenger instead.

In "Devil's Bargain", Asmodeus attempts to have Arthur Ketch track down and kill the weakened Lucifer. At the same time, he interrogates the Prophet Donatello Redfield, learning of the Winchesters' plot to open the door to Apocalypse World. Asmodeus places Donatello under his control as an unwitting spy. After Arthur fails to kill Lucifer, Asmodeus unveils his newest acquisition: the Archangel Blade, the one weapon that can kill Lucifer. Arthur points out that only an archangel can wield it, causing Asmodeus to introduce the archangel Gabriel who has been believed dead for nearly eight years. Gabriel is shown to be Asmodeus' prisoner.

In "The Thing", Arthur discovers Asmodeus injecting himself with Gabriel's grace. Asmodeus dismisses Arthur until he is ready to see the man, and is less than pleased to learn that Arthur knew that Castiel was in Syria seeking out the Tree of Life. Enraged by Arthur's recent actions, Asmodeus beats the man brutally, claiming Arthur to be worse than any demon he knows and that he owns Arthur due to this nature, despite Arthur's desire for redemption. Asmodeus' beating causes Arthur to break Gabriel out and steal the Archangel Blade and Asmodeus' store of Gabriel's extracted grace, bringing all three to the Winchesters.

In "Bring 'em Back Alive", Gabriel tells Sam and Castiel that after faking his death, he was captured and sold to Asmodeus who tortured him for years and used his grace to gain powers. As Sam and Castiel try to treat the traumatized Gabriel, Asmodeus uses his powers to seek Gabriel out, eventually locating him in the Winchester's bunker. Asmodeus calls Sam and threatens to destroy the bunker if Gabriel is not turned over to him in ten minutes. When Sam fails to comply, Asmodeus breaks through the wards and leads a demon incursion to kill Sam and Castiel and recapture Gabriel. Though the incursion is initially successful, when Asmodeus begins torturing Sam and Castiel, it causes Gabriel to snap out of his traumatized state and fight back. Asmodeus proves to be no match for the enraged archangel who incinerates Asmodeus in retaliation for all that the Prince of Hell did to him.

In "Unfinished Business", the Winchesters encounter Gabriel, who is seeking revenge against the Norse gods Loki, Fenrir, Sleipnir, and Narfi. Gabriel believes the gods betrayed him and sold him to Asmodeus to make a profit before Lucifer discovered he was still alive. Gabriel reveals that he was tortured by Asmodeus every day for years and remains weakened as Asmodeus drained much of his grace. Gabriel notes that his grace has not had a chance to recharge much after he used it to kill the Prince of Hell. Loki tells Dean later on that he sold Gabriel to Asmodeus because he blamed Gabriel for the death of his father Odin at Lucifer's hands.

Azazel

Barthamus
Barthamus is a Crossroads Demon portrayed by David Cubitt. High-ranking, Barthamus implies that he took over Crowley's old King of the Crossroads position after Crowley became the King of Hell.

In "The Scorpion and the Frog", Barthamus makes a demon working for him steal a Nephilim tracking spell from the Cambridge Museum in Cambridge, England. Rather than taking the spell to Asmodeus as the demon expects, Barthamus kills the demon with an angel blade and instead contacts the Winchesters to offer them a deal for the spell. Barthamus reveals that a man named Luther Shrike has a trunk containing Barthamus' property, though Barthamus refuses to reveal exactly what the property is. Barthamus needs Dean's blood to get into the vault as it only opens to the blood of a man who has been to Hell and back. Furthermore, Luther's property is warded against Barthamus. As further incentive, Barthamus threatens to give the tracking spell to Asmodeus instead. The Winchesters agree to the deal and are joined by a demon thief named Grab that Barthamus hired and a safecracker named Alice, who is revealed to have made a deal with Barthamus years before, which he uses as leverage to force Alice to work for him.

Though Grab is killed, the Winchesters and Alice succeed in stealing the trunk and confront Luther. To their shock, Luther reveals that Barthamus is the true villain in the situation. Two hundred years prior, Luther sold his soul to Barthamus in exchange for the demon saving his son from a terminal illness. The boy died of drowning a few years later, and Barthamus coldly refused to intervene. The trunk contains the leverage Luther used to force Barthamus to grant Luther invulnerability on his property and resurrect him after he was dragged to Hell. The leverage was Barthamus' original human bones, which, if burned, would kill the demon. When Luther leaves his property, Barthamus uses the chance to kill Luther through decapitation, but the Winchesters renege on the deal out of disgust for Barthamus' actions. Barthamus threatens Alice's life to force the Winchesters to hand over the trunk, but Alice uses Dean's lighter to burn the bones instead. Barthamus quickly goes up in flames and burns to ash. However, Barthamus' fiery death destroys the tracking spell which was in his hand at the time.

Bearded Demon
The Bearded Demon, portrayed by Mackenzie Murdock, is an unnamed demon who has a recurring role in the tenth, eleventh and twelfth seasons. He is often characterized as laughing at a situation even if it is inappropriate, a result of when he previously possessed a fourteen-year-old girl. He believes that some of the residual hormones may still remain.

In season 10's "Dark Dynasty", Crowley ties the demon to a pillar and uses him as a makeshift dartboard. Crowley's sadistic game of darts is interrupted by two demons with bad news about his mother. After killing one of the demons and sending the other away in fear, Crowley jabs his remaining darts into the demon's chest and leaves the room with the demon still tied to a pillar. Though left in pain by the move, the demon compliments the grouping.

In season 11's "We Happy Few", the demon attends the meeting where Crowley tries to rally the demons back under his control, only to fail. Along with another demon, the Bearded Demon openly mocks Crowley's failures and laughs at his bluster. He joins the other demons in abandoning Crowley.

In season 12's "Keep Calm and Carry On", the Bearded Demon, along with Jervis, is assigned by Lucifer to clean up all of his burned out vessels. The two demons are eventually confronted by Crowley and though nervous, he joins Jervis in mocking Crowley. After Crowley announces his intention to kill Lucifer while he is weakened, he openly laughs while Jervis mocks Crowley's words. Completely fed up, Crowley draws an angel blade and kills Jervis and then the Bearded Demon. Crowley mockingly asks "who's laughing now?" once both demons are dead.

Belphegor
Belphegor, portrayed by Alexander Calvert, is a demon who is released from Hell when God begins the Apocalypse and allies himself with the Winchesters. While he is a low-tier demon, his actual eye color is unknown as his host's eyes are burned out while Belphegor is possessing him. Belphegor only states that he is not a regular black-eyed grunt nor is he a Crossroads Demon. He is also known to have worked as a torturer in Hell.

In "Back and to the Future", possessing the corpse of Lucifer's Nephilim son Jack, Belphegor presents himself as an ally to the Winchesters. He explains that in Hell he tortures souls and loves his job and as such, he wants to restore Hell back to normal. While reluctant, the Winchesters and Castiel agree to ally with Belphegor who promises to leave Jack's body as soon as he finds a suitable new vessel. Belphegor helps the three escape the horde of zombies that has them trapped and offers a spell to contain the escaped souls to a one-mile radius around the cemetery where they were released. Working with Dean, Belphegor successfully casts the spell and contains the ghosts. However, he reveals to Dean that every door in Hell was opened which means two to three billion ghosts are now loose and in addition, Lucifer's Cage was opened, potentially releasing Michael to wreak havoc. In "Raising Hell", Belphegor continues to aid the Winchesters, Castiel and Rowena in their efforts to contain the escaped ghosts and the failing barrier. At the same time, Arthur Ketch reveals that he has been hired by the demon Ardat to assassinate Belphegor, whom she calls "a monstrous threat to humanity."

In "The Rupture", after the Book of the Damned fails to fix the barrier, Belphegor offers up a solution: Lilith's Crook, a horn created by Lilith to draw the demons and souls of Hell back to her in case they ever fell out of her control. While Belphegor and Castiel travel into Hell to get the crook, Sam and Rowena will perform a spell to seal the rupture. Though Belphegor claims he only needs Castiel as backup, Castiel remains suspicious of his motives, especially upon discovering that the crook is in a chest sealed in Enochian which only Castiel can read. The two are attacked by Ardat who reveals that Belphegor's true motive has always been to take power in Hell for himself and is using the Winchesters and Castiel for that purpose. Belphegor kills Ardat and confirms that she was telling the truth, intending to use the crook to draw all of the demons and souls inside of himself to gain unlimited power. As Belphegor uses the horn, he is beaten to the ground by Castiel and tries to pretend to be Jack to get Castiel to stop. Seeing through the deception, Castiel smites Belphegor without hesitation, killing the demon and destroying the crook but at the cost of burning Jack's body into a charred skeleton. After learning of Belphegor's demise, Dean is angry with Castiel as he feels that the demon was a threat they could have dealt with at a later time and Belphegor's demise before they could finish the plan resulted in Rowena having to sacrifice herself to send the remaining souls back to Hell. Castiel's actions with Belphegor as well as his hiding Jack's soulless state create a rift between the two for some time.

Brady
A demon who possessed one of Sam's friends in his sophomore year. Brady continued with his vessel's name to stay undercover but later revealed himself in season 5 episode 20. Brady introduced Sam to his girlfriend Jess and killed her later on Azazel's orders. He killed Jess the same way Azazel killed Mary Winchester. After he gives up Pestilence's location, Sam kills Brady in revenge for Jess' murder with Ruby's demon-killing knife.

Cain
Cain, (portrayed by Timothy Omundson) was the First Son of Adam and Eve who killed his brother Abel. While everyone believed that Cain had killed Abel because he was talking to God, Cain actually killed him because he was talking to Lucifer. Loving his brother, Cain made a deal with Lucifer: Abel's soul in Heaven in exchange for Cain becoming the first Knight of Hell while wielding the Mark of Cain. However, as part of the deal, Cain had to kill Abel personally. Afterwards, feeling remorse for his actions, Cain took his own life, but the Mark resurrected him as a powerful demon. For thousands of years, Cain was the worst of the worst, gaining the title Father of Murder and training the rest of the Knights of Hell. Eventually, Cain fell in love with a human woman, Colette, and gave up his evil ways for her, suppressing the Mark's influence on him to slaughter people. In 1863, the other Knights kidnapped Colette to force Cain back to his old ways. Cain slaughtered all of the Knights, but when he got to Abaddon, she possessed Colette and tricked Cain into killing his wife. Due to Colette's dying request, Cain didn't go after Abaddon for revenge and threw the First Blade to the bottom of the Marianas Trench as it couldn't be destroyed, eventually settling in Missouri. In First Born, while looking for the First Blade to kill Abaddon, Dean and Crowley tracked down Cain and asked for the First Blade. Cain was uninterested in helping them, wanting to keep his promise to Colette, but watched as Dean fought and killed three demons single-handedly. Impressed, Cain told Dean and Crowley his story, but still refused to help at first. Eventually, after speaking to Colette's grave, Cain chose to help by giving Dean the Mark of Cain so that he could wield the First Blade himself and kill Abaddon. In return, he asked Dean to kill him afterwards before sending Dean and Crowley away and taking on Abaddon's army single-handedly. In The Executioner's Song, it is revealed that killing Abaddon's demons caused Cain to fall back under the influence of the Mark of Cain. Giving into its rage, Cain decided that as so many of his descendants were killers and other sorts of criminals, he'd wipe out his bloodline, despite it being "legion." Cain killed many people, eventually being discovered by Sam and Dean when he kidnapped serial killer Tommy Tolliver. Cain confronted Castiel at the site of his victims' graves, but let him go so that Castiel would tell Dean who would bring the First Blade to kill him. Going after Tommy's son, Austin, Cain was lured into a devil's trap by Dean, Sam, Castiel and Crowley, after which Dean confronted him alone. Cain claimed to Dean that there was no cure for the Mark of Cain and it was better to give into its rage. Dean and Cain fought, but Cain proved more powerful and easily beat Dean, eventually getting the First Blade for himself. Before he could kill Dean, Dean managed to get Cain's knife and cut off his hand. Cain refused to give up killing, forcing Dean to kill him. While Dean retained his humanity, Cain's descent into madness left both him and Sam deeply worried.

Christian Campbell
Christian Campbell, portrayed by Corin Nemec, is a hunter, and a third cousin related to Sam and Dean's mother's side of the family. He is introduced to Dean along with the other Campbells in "Exile on Main Street" and helps Samuel Campbell trap the female Djinn. He is present in the compound in "Two and a Half Men", and it is agreed that he and his wife will raise the baby Shapeshifter despite Dean's objections. However, the Alpha Shapeshifter arrives, overpowers the hunters and takes back the baby. In "Family Matters", Christian discovers Dean investigating Samuel and the two exchange threats. Later, his neck is snapped by the Alpha Vampire. It is then revealed that he has been possessed by a demon for an unknown period of time and he and others overpower and remove the Alpha. The demon possessing Christian is working at Crowley's prison in "Caged Heat" and tortures the Lucifer loyalist Meg for information after capturing her. Meg is able to withstand his torture, retaliating with taunts about his technique. As he tortures Meg, the demon possessing Christian is surprised from behind by Dean who snatches Ruby's knife from his hand and stabs the demon through the back with it, killing him.

The Crossroads Demon
A specific crossroads demon recurred throughout the second and third seasons of the series, possessing only young, beautiful women as her host. Actresses Christie Laing and Jeannette Sousa first portray her in "Crossroad Blues". Laing plays the demon in flashbacks depicting musician Robert Johnson selling his soul to learn to play the guitar, while Sousa portrays the demon in the present. The latter is summoned by Dean in an attempt to rescue a man from a demonic pact previously made. She rejects Dean's plea, instead taunting him about his father's suffering in Hell. Dean tricks her into walking into a Devil's Trap, and frees her in exchange for releasing the man from his contract. The demon returns again in the second-season finale "All Hell Breaks Loose", now in possession of a woman portrayed by Ona Grauer. She resurrects Sam in exchange for collecting Dean's soul in one year.

She makes her final appearance in "Bedtime Stories", now portrayed by Sandra McCoy. At the end of the episode, Sam summons her and demands she break her deal with Dean in exchange for her life. She claims to not hold the contract, being just an employee with a boss to answer to. A frustrated Sam kills the demon with the mystical Colt gun. McCoy was dating lead actor Jared Padalecki at that time after having worked with him on the 2005 film Cry Wolf. She previously auditioned for several love interests of the brothers, but believed that production had waited until the "perfect role" arrived before casting her due to their relationship.

Crowley

Dagon
Dagon (portrayed by Ali Ahn) is one of the four Princes of Hell and one of the oldest and most powerful demons in existence. Despite being female (or in a female host), Dagon is still referred to as a Prince of Hell rather than a Princess. Like her brothers Ramiel and Asmodeus, Dagon long ago lost interest in Lucifer's plans and left Hell for a life on Earth. She is implied to have failed Lucifer in some way at some point.

She is first mentioned in a flashback in "Stuck in the Middle (With You)", when Ramiel tells Crowley that Dagon has her "toys" and is uninterested in ruling Hell. Later, Ramiel tells the Winchesters that Dagon has taken an interest in Lucifer's unborn Nephilim child, though Ramiel himself couldn't care less.

Dagon is first introduced in person in "Family Feud", when she kills two angels to save the life of Kelly Kline, the mother of Lucifer's unborn child. In "Somewhere Between Heaven and Hell", Castiel learns of Dagon's involvement and warns the Winchesters about her, stating that all he knows of Dagon is rumors of her psychotic savagery.

Dagon continues her role as protector of Lucifer's child in "The British Invasion". She is revealed to secretly be working for Lucifer who has promised Dagon a place at his side if she succeeds and is often in telepathic communication with the Fallen archangel. To cover her tracks, Dagon has another demon murder everyone who meets Dagon and Kelly, including a doctor who did a fetal examination on Kelly's insistence. Dagon's activities are discovered by hunter Eileen Leahy, who helps lure Kelly out. Dagon shows up at the meeting and resists all attempts to kill her, including with the Colt. Dagon disappears with Kelly and reveals to the woman that the pregnancy will ultimately be fatal to her.

In "The Future", Dagon finds Kelly following her suicide and resurrection by Lucifer's child. While Kelly now believes the child to be good, Dagon believes that the child simply acted out of self-preservation. Dagon is later attacked by a team of angels led by Castiel who attempt to kill her with the Colt. Castiel escapes with Kelly, but Dagon kills one of the angels and tortures the other for information before killing him too. Dagon then intercepts Castiel at Heaven's portal, killing the angel Joshua and engaging Castiel in battle. Dagon proves to be stronger than the angel, easily beating him to a pulp. The intervention of the Winchesters leads only to Dagon breaking Dean's arm and effectively destroying the Colt. As Dagon goes to kill Castiel, Lucifer's child empowers the angel from the womb, enabling him to stop Dagon and render her powerless to Dagon's shock. With the help of Lucifer's child, Castiel incinerates Dagon, killing her as predicted in a premonition the child shared with Kelly. The child's aid against Dagon convinces Castiel of his goodness.

In the season 13 episode "Lost & Found", the newborn Jack, Lucifer's son, experiences a flashback to Dagon's death when asked what he remembers. Jack states that he remembers "when the bad woman burned."

Dipper
Dipper is a minor demon portrayed by Shane Dean appearing in season 13 that is loyal to Asmodeus.

In "Various & Sundry Villains", Dipper, armed with an angel blade, acts as a guard to the captive Lucifer and Castiel. Dipper greatly enjoys the two angels predicament and often taunts Lucifer about his lack of power and his attempt to use his powers on a stick while Lucifer impotently threatens Dipper and makes fun of his name. Dipper eventually returns to find Castiel and Lucifer arguing and Lucifer's stick gone. As Dipper taunts Lucifer about losing his stick, Lucifer suddenly pulls Dipper against the cell bars with telekinesis, burns through his warding and breaks his stick off in Dipper's neck. Lucifer explains to a shocked and terrified Dipper that anger is a good motivator and that he forgets that "I'm Lucifer." As Dipper turns around, he is confronted by an escaped Castiel who mocks that "someone got mad and broke his warding." Castiel smites Dipper and Lucifer steals Dipper's angel blade to arm himself for their escape. After killing four more demons that accost them after Dipper's death, Lucifer and Castiel succeed in escaping before Asmodeus can return.

Drexel
Drexel is a minor demon portrayed by Alex Barima who is loyal to Lucifer.

Drexel first appears in season 12's "The British Invasion" when Crowley brings the supposedly subservient Lucifer before the lesser demons. In reality, Lucifer makes it clear that he is truly in charge. Drexel later visits Lucifer in his cell and magically examines him, determining that Lucifer's vessel is sound and that the repairs and improvements to it are holding. However, Drexel is unable to break Crowley's security system upon Lucifer who reacts violently to the news. Drexel reveals that a demon named Spevak created and installed the system and was then killed by Crowley to hide its secrets. Lucifer makes it clear that he intends Drexel to find a way to release him from Crowley's control.

In "There's Something About Mary", Drexel's attempts to break Crowley's control over Lucifer result in the system inverting so that Lucifer can now control Crowley's vessel. Lucifer uses this to turn the situation on Crowley and apparently kills him in front of Drexel and the other demons. After Lucifer departs in search of his son, Drexel orders two demons to remove Crowley's dead body before Lucifer returns.

In season 13's "The Rising Son", Drexel polishes Lucifer's throne and continues to hold the belief that Lucifer will return, something that Drexel is mocked for by the other demons. When a demon introducing himself as Asmodeus suddenly appears, Drexel is shocked to realize that it is the fourth Prince of Hell. Asmodeus announces his intention to take over the throne of Hell until Lucifer and his son can be found. When Asmodeus summarily executes the demons who don't meet his standards, Drexel is one of three demons that he spares. Drexel coordinates the search for Lucifer and his son for Asmodeus and is told about Asmodeus' history with creatures known as the Shedim, a history that caused Lucifer to inflict lasting scars upon Asmodeus' face.

Duke
Duke, portrayed by Aidan Kahn, is a rogue Crossroads Demon appearing in season 11 who sets out for his own benefit following the release of the Darkness and Lucifer.

In "Beyond the Mat", Duke forces wrestler Gunner Lawless to help him murder people and steal their souls so that Duke can create a "nest egg" for himself with the release of the Darkness and Lucifer ruling Hell again. Having made a crossroads deal with Gunner ten years before, Duke offers to keep the hellhounds at bay if Gunner works for him, a deal Gunnar reluctantly takes. The Winchesters come to the funeral of one of Duke's victims, their father's favorite wrestler and stumble across the crime scene of his newest target, quickly putting together that they are dealing with a demon stealing souls. Duke tries to convince another wrestler to make a deal and join him, but the man refuses and Duke had Gunner murder him shortly before the Winchesters arrive. Duke sends Gunner to kill Dean while he takes care of Sam personally, explaining his plot to Sam. Though briefly interrupted by Dean, Duke flings him away with telekinesis and prepares to kill Sam, commenting that "this is my favorite part." However, before he can kill Sam, Gunner stabs Duke through the back with Ruby's Knife, killing him after having been convinced to do the right thing by Dean. With Duke no longer holding them back, the hellhounds come after Gunner who accepts his fate.

Gerald
Gerald, portrayed by Jackson Berlin and Viv Leacock, is a minor demon appearing season 10. He once mentions that he killed his own mother over cigarettes.

In "Girls, Girls, Girls", Gerald runs a brothel alongside Raul and another demon to increase soul numbers following the war with Abaddon. The operation is interrupted by the witch Rowena MacLeod who hits Raul with a spell that liquifies the demon. Terrified, Gerald flees his vessel and possesses a nearby construction worker to report in to Crowley who is disgusted by Gerald and Raul's operation which Crowley finds to be just tacky. Gerald spurs Crowley to action against Rowena who is captured by a backup team led by Gerald after the main team is killed by the Winchesters. To his shock, Crowley realizes that Rowena is his own mother.

In "The Things We Left Behind", Gerald, still possessing the construction worker, acts as a guard to Crowley's dungeon and eagerly urges Crowley to kill Rowena. Gerald offers to do it for Crowley if Crowley can't bring himself to do it, mentioning how he once killed his own mother. Rowena and the demon Trish later claim that Gerald is the one who is smuggling other demons out of Hell, enraging Gerald into strangling Rowena. When Gerald refuses to relent, Crowley kills him by stabbing Gerald through the back of the head and out of his mouth with an angel blade. Following Gerald's death, Crowley becomes more accepting of Rowena while it is revealed that Rowena and Trish lied and used Gerald as a scapegoat to gain Crowley's trust. Subsequently, in "The Hunter Games", Rowena reminds Guthrie how she exposed the "traitor" Gerald when he is reluctant to help her out.

Grab
Grab is a demon thief appearing in season 13 portrayed by Matthew Kevin Anderson. He is described as an expert in bypassing supernatural security and is portrayed as more obnoxious than evil or malicious despite being a demon. Its implied that Grab is not actually his real name but an alias.

In "The Scorpion and the Frog", Grab is hired by the Crossroads Demon Barthamus to work with the Winchesters and a human safe cracker named Alice to break into the vault of Luther Shrike and retrieve Barthamus' property. Grab is brought in to use his talents in bypassing supernatural security to locate the vault itself which can only be opened by Dean's blood. Once the Winchesters and Alice get onto Luther's property, Dean performs a summoning spell to bring Grab to them. Grab uses a spell to turn Dean into a sort of dousing rod, using the attraction between Dean's blood and the vault to find it. After the vault is found, Grab chooses to remain outside, apparently too afraid to go any further. While he waits outside the cellar containing the vault, Grab is confronted by Luther himself. Luther quickly kills Grab with Ruby's Knife and his body is later found by Alice. Barthamus shows no care for Grab's death and compels Alice to keep going.

Guthrie
Guthrie, portrayed by Russell Roberts, is a former Crossroads Demon that acts as Crowley's personal assistant in season 10.

In "Soul Survivor", Guthrie reports to Crowley on Castiel's weakened state and suggests that it would be a good time to eliminate the angel. Instead, Crowley orders Guthrie to follow Castiel and report back to him.

In "The Hunter Games", under the influence of a spell secretly cast by Rowena, Crowley has a nightmare where Guthrie and several other demons team up together to attack and kill him. Later, Guthrie finds Rowena snooping around Crowley's throne room and orders her out, not falling for her attempts to charm him. After learning of Crowley going after the First Blade for the Winchesters, Rowena approaches Guthrie to get it for her. Having learned that Guthrie is a former Crossroads Demon, Rowena knows he has the ability to teleport and uses her position as Crowley's mother to trick Guthrie into thinking that Crowley is having her order Guthrie to get it for him.

Guthrie reluctantly steals the First Blade before Crowley can get to it, but refuses to give it to Rowena, instead choosing to give it to Crowley himself. In retaliation, Rowena kills Guthrie with an angel blade but is interrupted by Crowley before she can get the First Blade from his body. Rowena invents a cover story where Guthrie was plotting against Crowley which he believes because of his nightmare. Rowena is also able to use Guthrie's "betrayal" to cause Crowley to hesitate in handing over the First Blade to the Winchesters.

Harrington
Harrington is a minor demon appearing in season 13 that is loyal to Asmodeus.

In "The Rising Son", Harrington is one of the demons in the throne room of Crowley's former palace following Lucifer's disappearance. When the Prince of Hell Asmodeus arrives to take control of Hell until Lucifer or his son can be found, Harrington is one of the demons that Asmodeus spares from a summary execution alongside Sierra and Drexel. Later, Asmodeus sends Sierra and Harrington to kill the Winchesters and Prophet Donatello Redfield while he uses the Nephilim Jack to release the Shedim from Hell. As Sierra goes after the Winchesters, Harrington goes after Donatello and pins him to a wall as Harrington prepares to stab the man. Harrington is spotted from down the hall by the Winchesters and Dean throws an angel blade into Harrington's neck like a throwing knife, killing Harrington. The move surprises and impresses Sam and Donatello while Dean comments how housekeeping will not be pleased to have to clean up Harrington's body.

Jael
Jael is a sadistic Crossroads Demon appearing in Supernatural portrayed by Kara Royster, Billy Wickman and Kim Rhodes. Despite appearing mainly in female vessels, Jael is specifically referred to as male by characters.

As mentioned in season 12's "Celebrating the Life of Asa Fox", Jael was first encountered by legendary hunter Asa Fox in 1997. Possessing a young First Nations girl, Jael was exorcised by Asa. However, due to his sadistic tendencies, Jael brutally murdered the girl he was possessing before Asa could finish exorcising him. Jael was eventually escaped from Hell and targeted Asa for revenge, murdering people who Asa cared about in sick and twisted ways and leaving their bodies in the forest for him to find. In 2016, Asa hunted Jael through the forest near his home with his best friend Bucky. The two men got into an argument about the hunt as Asa was not armed with his angel blade, the one weapon that could kill Jael. The argument ended with Bucky accidentally killing Asa when he hit his head on a rock. Bucky framed Jael for Asa's murder, unaware that the sadistic Crossroads Demon had witnessed the incident and was enraged that he himself could not kill Asa.

In retaliation for Asa's murder at hands other than his own, Jael began targeting the hunters at Asa's wake, magically trapping them in Asa's home and possessing Alicia Banes to kill one. Though originally trapped outside, Dean Winchester got back in with the help of the Reaper Billie and eventually found Jael in the body of hunter Elvis Katz. When Dean began an exorcism, Jael snapped Elvis' neck so far his head faced backwards and vacated his body. Jael next possessed Sheriff Jody Mills and attempted to convince the Winchesters that their mother was possessed and they had to kill her. The Winchesters quickly saw through "Jody's" strange behavior and Jael revealed himself. Unable to kill Jael without harming Jody also, the hunters were handicapped and quickly defeated by Jael who telekinetically pinned them to the floor. Jael took great pleasure in prancing around revealing everyone's darkest secrets, but when he focused his attention on Bucky, his grip on the other hunters was broken. Sam quickly began an exorcism, but was flung away by Jael. Dean picked up the exorcism and then Max and Alicia Banes when Dean was knocked out, but they were defeated as well. Jael finally forced Bucky to admit that it was in fact Bucky who killed Asa and not Jael. Moments later, while Jael was still distracted by Bucky, Mary Winchester finished the exorcism. Jael was exorcised out of Jody who survived the possession and the demon was sent back to Hell through the floor of the room, burning a circle around the spot he passed through.

Jervis
Jervis is a low-level demon portrayed by Jesse Reid appearing in season 11 and season 12 who is loyal to Crowley and then Lucifer.

In "Out of the Darkness, Into the Fire", Jervis appears at Marnie's house along with another demon when Crowley summons them using a Goblet of Blood. The demons reassure Crowley that a team is securing his usual vessel and getting a witch to remove Rowena's immobilization spell. After Crowley returns to his usual vessel, Jervis reveals that there was a disturbance in Lucifer's Cage which seemed like either or possibly both Michael and Lucifer screaming. After the other demon tells Crowley that demons believe that they are trying to warn everyone about the Darkness, Jervis informs Crowley that half of Hell is freaking out as a result.

In "Our Little World", Jervis reports to Crowley on Marco's successful efforts to eliminate Amara's soulless victims and how court numbers are low due to the number of demons Amara has consumed. After finding the door to Amara's room unguarded, a displeased Crowley orders Jervis to guard it himself. Later, when the Winchesters arrive in an attempt to kill Amara, Dean draws Jervis out by playing an old voicemail from Crowley. Jervis is ambushed by Sam and quickly subdued, but Sam chooses to restrain Jervis rather than kill him due to his new policy of focusing more on saving people.

In "Keep Calm and Carry On", Jervis and another demon work for Lucifer cleaning up his burned out vessels, followed, unknown to them, by Crowley. Crowley eventually confronts the demons, stating that he plans to kill Lucifer while he's still weak to regain full control of Hell. Jervis openly mocks Crowley's plans, now completely loyal to Lucifer. Fed up, particularly after the other demon begins laughing, Crowley draws an angel blade and quickly kills both Jervis and the other demon with it.

Kip
Kip, portrayed by Dean Armstrong, is a six hundred year old sadistic and cruel demon who "burned half the world" while riding with Genghis Khan as a human. As a demon, he went on to enjoy spreading chaos and destruction across the world and apparently developed a taste for eating humans as well as killing them.

In season 14's "Stranger in a Strange Land", Kip meets with and ambushes the angel Castiel before calling Sam Winchester to demand a meeting. Kip reveals that with the recent deaths of Crowley, Asmodeus, and Lucifer, Hell has been left without a leader. A recent meeting with the alternate reality version of the archangel Michael has caused Kip to reevaluate his life and decide that he wants everything and he has begun attempting to take up the position of King of Hell. Kip attempts to make a deal with Sam to work with him instead of against him, but Sam sees through Kip's façade to his true cruel nature. In the battle that follows, Kip overpowers Sam, but Sam takes him by surprise and manages to kill Kip with Ruby's demon-killing knife. After Kip's death, Sam proclaims to the other demons present that there will be no more Kings of Hell and anyone who wishes to try for the position will have to go through him. Terrified by their leader's death, the remaining demons vacate their vessels and flee in acquiescence to Sam's demands.

Lilith

Meg Masters

Ramiel
Ramiel (portrayed by Jerry Trimble) is one of the four Princes of Hell in Supernatural alongside Azazel, Dagon and Asmodeus. As a Prince of Hell, Ramiel is one of the oldest and most powerful demons to ever live and a retired demonic general. Unlike Azazel, Ramiel has long-since lost interest in Lucifer's plans and separated himself from Hell, joined by Dagon and Asmodeus. During his time on Earth, Ramiel becomes a collector of rare supernatural artifacts and weapons.

In a flashback in "Stuck in the Middle (With You)", the demon Crowley meets with Ramiel in 2010 following the defeat of Lucifer and the end of the Apocalypse. With Lucifer locked up again and Lilith and Azazel dead, Ramiel is next in line to be the King of Hell. However, Ramiel is uninterested, continuing to have no interest in the affairs of Hell and calling Azazel a "fanatic." Instead, Ramiel suggests that Crowley take power, but warns that if anyone disturbs him, there will be severe consequences. Crowley accepts Ramiel's terms and presents him with two gifts: the Lance of Michael, a weapon designed by the archangel Michael to kill Lucifer slowly and the Colt, the legendary gun that had once been used to kill Ramiel's brother Azazel.

In the present day of the episode, hunter Mary Winchester is sent by the British Men of Letters to steal the Colt from Ramiel. The organization fails to inform Mary that Ramiel is a Prince of Hell, leaving the group of hunters she assembles woefully unprepared to fight the demon. Mary claims that Ramiel is simply a demon she is trying to eliminate that is doing evil actions while hiding her true purpose from the group. After a failed intervention by Crowley's demons, Mary succeeds in stealing the Colt before Ramiel returns from night fishing. Due to his sheer power as a Prince of Hell, Ramiel shrugs off all attempts to kill him and mortally wounds the angel Castiel with the Lance of Michael. Enraged by the theft of the Colt, Ramiel tracks the hunters to a barn and attacks Crowley when he attempts to intercede on the Winchesters behalf. The Winchesters briefly trap Ramiel in Holy Fire and he demands the return of the Colt. When they fail to turn it over, Ramiel breaks free of the Holy Fire and attacks the hunters, once more shrugging off their attacks. After Ramiel nearly kills Dean, Sam steals the Lance of Michael from him with the help of a distraction by Mary and impales the Prince with the weapon. Designed to kill Lucifer, the Lance turns Ramiel to dust and is shortly thereafter destroyed by Crowley to save Castiel's life.

In "The Raid", when the Alpha Vampire leads an attack on the British Men of Letters compound, the British Men of Letters are forced to reveal their possession of the Colt to Sam. Mary is forced to explain that she stole the gun from Ramiel.

In the long run, Ramiel is portrayed as the one Prince of Hell who truly wants nothing to do with the affairs of others. During his confrontation with the Winchesters, Ramiel states plainly that he just doesn't care about anything other than being left alone. While Dagon and Asmodeus had originally followed his example, both later returned to the affairs of Hell with the return of Lucifer and the birth of his son, both things that Ramiel knew of but didn't care to do anything about. Despite his evil nature, Ramiel is indicated to have not committed any acts of evil during his tenure on Earth in retirement, at least nothing traceable. While discussing Ramiel during the planning meeting, it is noted that the only thing he's done for sure is night fishing. In contrast, Dagon and Asmodeus are known to still have committed evil acts while retired. During his confrontation with the Winchesters, Ramiel predicts Dagon's approaching role in events when he tells them that "my sister Dagon has taken an interest" in Lucifer's child. As well, before meeting Ramiel, the Winchesters were unaware that there was more than one Yellow-Eyed Demon as the only Prince they had previously met was Azazel. The Winchesters only learned the significance of what the yellow eyes represented when Crowley told them about the Princes of Hell following their first meeting with Ramiel.

Raul
Raul, portrayed by Michael Antonakos, is a demon who leads a brothel in season 10 alongside Gerald and another demon to increase soul numbers following the war with Abaddon. The brothel, known as Raul's Girls, worked by kidnapping young women, forcing them into prostitution and then selling them to men in exchange for the men selling their souls as payment.

In "Girls, Girls, Girls", Raul chases after one of the girls, Tiana, who managed to escape. Raul catches up to Tiana and confronts her, leading to Tiana stabbing out Raul's right eye with a high-heeled shoe. Unharmed and more annoyed than anything, Raul snaps Tiana's neck in retaliation and takes to wearing an eyepatch to cover up his missing eye. Sam and Dean Winchester learn about Raul's Girls after rescuing Shaylene, one of his girls and killing his unnamed partner. Before they can catch up with Raul, the witch Rowena MacLeod arrives at the brothel and tosses Raul a hex bag containing the Defigere Et Depurgare spell. The spell causes Raul's demon form to liquify which he chokes up out of his vessel's mouth, killing him. His body is later found by the Winchesters who identify Rowena through the spell, one that she herself had created centuries before.

Ruby

Samhain

Samhain is a powerful whitish-eyed demon and the Origin of Halloween in season 4.

It is unknown when and how Samhain was actually born, driven to hell, died, the reason why he went to hell at all, and was created. The fact that his resurrection breaks one of the 66 seals, however, suggests that it was created before the imprisonment of Lucifer. Before he was imprisoned in Hell centuries ago, he reigned over Earth on Halloween night. People kept their children inside, they left treats to appease him and they left carved pumpkins on their doorsteps to worship him. His power seems to be intermediate between that of black-eyed demons and white-eyed demons. He maintains all traits and powers of a normal black-eyed demon, and he also proved capable of emanating a demonic energy blast similar to Lilith's. Unlike other demons, however, he is capable of summoning monsters, such as ghosts, zombies, etc. He is summoned by two witches, one of whom he kills himself, but Sam manages to exorcise him again with his powers. He differs from other demons in that its eye color is either pale blue and/or possibly gray. His eyes appear to be a hybridized iris pigment of blue and gray, but his sclera is white and his pupil black. Samhain is the only so far known Whitish Eyed Demon and presumably the only one ever.

Wanting to summon Samhain, two witches named Tracy Davis and Don Harding start performing the sacrifices needed to summon Samhain. This draws the attention of the Winchesters and the angels as the raising of Samhain is one of the 66 Seals. Sam and Dean kill Don, but Tracy reveals herself and successfully summons Samhain, breaking the seal. Samhain possesses Don's body and recognizes Tracy before killing her. Samhain is unable to tell that Sam and Dean are alive due to a "mask" of blood they smeared on their faces so he leaves them alone.

Samhain travels to a mausoleum where a bunch of high school students are having a party, locks them in and summons zombies and at least one ghost that attack. Sam and Dean rescue most of the kids and Dean deals with the monsters while Sam faces Samhain. Sam proves immune to Samhain's power so they fight hand to hand, but even with the demon-killing knife, Sam is no match for the demon. Finally, in the end, Sam manages to exorcise Samhain with his powers and sends him back to Hell.

A drawing of Samhain can be seen in Anna Milton's journal. The description says "Samhain. The next seal is broken." In Anna's drawing, Samhain's eyes are completely whitish, showing that Samhain is classified as a whitish eyed demon.

Sierra
Sierra is a minor demon appearing in season 13 that is loyal to Asmodeus.

In "The Rising Son", Sierra is one of the demons in the throne room of Crowley's former palace following Lucifer's disappearance. When the Prince of Hell Asmodeus arrives to take control of Hell until Lucifer or his son can be found, Sierra is one of the demons that Asmodeus spares from a summary execution alongside Harrington and Drexel. Later, Asmodeus sends Sierra and Harrington to kill the Winchesters and Prophet Donatello Redfield while he uses the Nephilim Jack to release the Shedim from Hell. Sierra attacks Dean when Dean is alone in his motel room, easily breaking free of Dean's attempts to pin him and throwing Dean onto the bed. Before Sierra can attack Dean with a knife, Sam stabs Sierra through the back with an angel blade, killing him.

Simmons
Simmons is a minor demon portrayed by Bethany Brown appearing in season 11 that is loyal to Lucifer and hates Crowley.

In "The Vessel", Simmons is amongst the demons in Lucifer's court and urges Lucifer to take the fight to the Darkness. Simmons urges Lucifer to send demons to seek out the Darkness to "really beat the bushes" and openly mocks Crowley's rule. A broken Crowley emerges from his cage to berate Simmons for disrespecting her master - Lucifer.

In "Beyond the Mat", Simmons helps Lucifer coordinate his search for another Hand of God and enjoys Lucifer's tormenting of Crowley. Later, Simmons frees Crowley from his cage, claiming that there are still demons who support Crowley and wish him to take back Hell, convincing the broken Crowley to fight back. Simmons is impressed when Crowley single-handedly kills two demons and accompanies him to a lock-up where Crowley reveals that he owns the Aaron's rod, another Hand of God. Simmons then reveals that she actually hates Crowley and is in fact loyal to Lucifer who arrives to take the Hand of God. Simmons' help was a ploy to get Crowley to lead them to the secret Lucifer knew he was still keeping. However, Crowley anticipated the double-cross and absorbs the Rod's power for himself. Crowley fires an energy blast at Lucifer using the Rod's power in an attempt to kill him, but Simmons jumps in the way and is combusted to dust. Simmons' sacrifice spares Lucifer while Crowley exhausts the Rod's power in the attempt and is forced to flee.

Hunters
Hunters are men and women who spend their lives hunting supernatural creatures and attempting to save those affected by these creatures. Most appear to have had some kind of negative encounter with the supernatural, which prompts them to become hunters. While hunters, by their nature, operate 'off-the-grid, there are, nevertheless, hunter communities that meet and interact with each other to exchange information and stories; the Harvelle Roadhouse was one such location until it was burnt down. Typically, hunters find cases by consulting newspapers to track down information about suspicious deaths in certain areas. Some cases come about thanks to contact with people they knew before becoming hunters or contact with people they helped during previous hunts who turn to them for their expertise. Some hunters are shown to have particular targets, such as Sam and Dean's initial hunts in the show's first two seasons focusing on tracking the Yellow Eyed Demon who killed Dean and Sam's parents, or Gordon Walker 'specializing' in hunting vampires.

Alex Jones
Annie "Alex" Jones, portrayed by Katherine Ramdeen, is a hunter appearing in Supernatural. She is the adoptive daughter of Jody Mills and the adoptive sister of Claire Novak.

She was first introduced in season 9's "Alex Annie Alexis Ann". Annie was kidnapped by vampires from her family at a young age, where she took the name Alex, and acted as bait for her vampire "family". She was adopted by Jody Mills after her vampire "family" was defeated, as they had both lost their families. After Claire Novak was adopted by Jody, the two girls were not close until Claire saves her from vampires who returned to take revenge on Alex. Alex later went to nursing school and got a job at the Sioux Falls hospital, and also began to be trained as a hunter. In "Damaged Goods", Donna Hanscum mentions that Alex took out two vetala by herself while updating Dean.

Asa Fox
Asa Fox, portrayed by Shaine Jones as an adult and Jack Moore as a child is a legendary Canadian hunter appearing in Supernatural.

As shown in flashbacks in season 12's "Celebrating the Life of Asa Fox", in 1980, a twelve-year old Asa was attacked by a werewolf, an attack that left a lasting scar upon his face. Asa was saved by hunter Mary Winchester who had come out of retirement briefly to tie up some loose ends, including killing the werewolf and stopping its killing spree. Asa became interested in what Mary was doing, especially when she told him that she intended to return to retirement. Inspired by the encounter, Asa went on to become a hunter himself despite his mother's objections and became legendary in the hunting community. Asa wrote postcards throughout his life to Mary detailing his discoveries and hunts, but never sent them as he never learned her whereabouts. During his hunting trips, Asa had many trysts  with local women, one of which, with witch Tasha Banes, resulted in two children, Max and Alicia. In 2016, Asa met Sheriff Jody Mills while on a ghoul hunt and, unaware that the sheriff was also a hunter, claimed that he was FBI agent Fox Mulder while investigating the case. Jody saw through his obvious disguise, helped him complete the hunt, and began a casual relationship with Asa whenever he was around. While Asa was not aware of it, Jody held him in high regard and harbored hopes that their relationship could become more serious.

In 1997, Asa came up against the sadistic Crossroads Demon Jael. Asa managed to exorcise the demon, but not before the demon brutally murdered the young girl he was possessing. After escaping from Hell again, Jael began a personal vendetta against Asa, murdering a woman that Asa was seeing as well as other people he cared about and leaving their bodies in the forest for him to find. In 2016, Asa hunted Jael through a forest with his best friend Bucky Sims despite Asa not being armed with his angel blade, leading to an argument between the two men. During the argument, Bucky shoved Asa who fell and hit his head on a rock and died. Bucky then framed Asa's death as his having been murdered by Jael.

While on a visit to Jody, Mary's children Sam and Dean learned of Asa's death and decided to accompany Jody to his funeral. While never meeting personally, Sam and Dean recalled hearing stories about him in Ellen's roadhouse, and Asa's peer hunters were quick to share stories of him killing five wendigos in one night. Dean expressed skepticism initially (due to hearing the story in the midst of a drinking game inspired by the exploit) but he later confided to Sam that he believed Asa to be a 'legit' hunter, evidenced by his armory, complete with an angel blade. During the funeral, they encountered their mother Mary who had recently been resurrected following her death in 1983. Mary had received word of Asa's death and was distressed to learn that he had become a hunter. Jael took advantage of the funeral to target the other hunters one by one, finally possessing Jody. In Jody's body, Jael confessed to feeling cheated out of Asa's murder and forced Bucky to admit that he had killed Asa. Before carrying out a brutal revenge against the hunters, Sam, Dean, Max, Alicia and Mary, exorcised Jael from Jody in a sequential attack, with each subsequent hunter picking up the Latin incantation where the previous one left off. As a result of Jael's efforts, Bucky was disgraced for killing his best friend. Rather than exacting revenge upon Bucky themselves, the hunters chose to spread the true story of what happened. The next morning, Asa was given a Hunter's Funeral alongside the two hunters murdered by Jael at his wake.

Bobby Singer

Charlie Bradbury
Charlie Bradbury (born Celeste Middleton) (played by Felicia Day) first crosses paths with Sam and Dean when working as an I.T. expert at Richard Roman Enterprises. She is initially reluctant to get involved in the supernatural world by helping the Winchesters, but becomes a more reliable ally in her second episode and decides to become a hunter herself by her fourth episode. She quickly becomes a friend and even a surrogate little sister to the Winchesters. By the end of "The Girl with the Dungeons and Dragons Tattoo", it is revealed that her real name is not Charlie Bradbury but merely one of her aliases, and that she has had to go into hiding before. "Pac-Man Fever" delves into her past and it is indicated that "Charlie's" true surname is Middleton. "There's No Place Like Home" reveals that Charlie's given name is in fact Celeste Middleton. She is the only prominent LGBT character on the show; in her first episode, she informs the brothers she is lesbian  when she is asked to flirt with a male guard to gain access to a restricted area.

Charlie's first appearance is in the season seven episode "The Girl with the Dungeons and Dragons Tattoo", where Dick Roman asks her to decrypt Frank Devereaux's hard drive. Once she succeeds, she starts reading files describing the Leviathans and their activities, including their connection to Dick Roman. Although she doesn't believe it at first, she realizes the truth when she witnesses a leviathan eat her supervisor and shapeshift to replace him—something Dick explains they cannot do to Charlie, as she possesses a rare "spark" that can't be perfectly replicated. Sam and Dean recruit a terrified Charlie to retrieve Frank's hard drive to protect the information there, as well as to break into Dick's office and hack his emails to gain information for their side. She does so, which alerts Sam and Dean to a secret package meant for Dick which they then steal; the package is later revealed to hold the secret to defeating the leviathan. She is nearly killed when Dick realizes her duplicity, but is saved by Bobby's ghost holding the leviathan off—breaking Charlie's arm in the process—whilst Sam and Dean arrive and rescue her. She leaves after telling Sam and Dean not to contact her again.

Charlie reappears in the season eight episode "LARP and the Real Girl". Now under a different alias, Carrie Heinlein, she is the queen of one of four kingdoms of the LARPing game of Moondoor. When two of her "subjects" are killed, it draws Sam and Dean's attention and they head to Moondoor. Charlie's initial reaction is to flee and start a new life again, fearing that she will once more become a target for monsters. After learning why Sam and Dean are there, she agrees to help them investigate the deaths and other mysterious injuries that have happened. Charlie is eventually captured by a good fairy named Gilda who has kidnapped her on her master's orders. Charlie is instantly smitten with Gilda. Dean, Sam and Gerry eventually find Charlie with help from the "prisoner", only to find that she is making out with Gilda. It is revealed that Gerry is Gilda's master; he has unrequited feelings for Charlie and has bought a spellbook with which to control Gilda and force her to kill other players as part of a scheme to make Charlie fall in love with him. Charlie eventually destroys the book to set Gilda free and render Gerry powerless. Afterward, she and Gilda share a goodbye kiss before Gilda returns to her world with Gerry to have Gerry punished. Charlie decides to stop running and changing her identity and to stay and make a life for once. She tells Sam and Dean to call her if they ever need her help again. The three of them participate in a mock battle between their group and the other LARPers, which Charlie's side wins. Charlie's backstory is explored when she returns in "Pac-Man Fever" to give Sam and Dean a case. After she proves to be an excellent shot, Dean takes her as his (temporary) partner instead of Sam, who has become increasingly ill from the trials. Charlie is eventually captured by the creature they are hunting, a type of djinn, who poisons Charlie and places her in a nightmare from which she won't wake up from. In her nightmare, she is trapped in a video game she stole as a kid, recreated, and gave out for free, and where she must endlessly protect her hospitalized mother from super-soldier vampires. It is revealed that her parents had been involved in a car accident when driving over to pick Charlie up from a sleepover, resulting in her father dying and her mother rendered brain-dead. Charlie has been paying for the care of her mother, whom she refuses to let go due to her feelings of guilt over the accident. When Dean takes a potion to enter her nightmare himself to save her, he convinces Charlie that she must let her mother go to move on. She then wakes up and in the episode's last scene, takes Dean's advice by having her mother taken off of life-support after reading The Hobbit aloud to her like her mother did to Charlie as a little girl.

Charlie is called in by the Winchesters for help in the ninth-season episode "Slumber Party" to reconfigure an ancient computer at the Men of Letters' bunker. A childhood fan of L. Frank Baum's Oz books, Charlie is excited when the real Dorothy is found in the bunker. The group works together to try to find a way to defeat The Wicked Witch of the West. Charlie dies to protect Dean from the Witch, but he has Gadreel bring her back to life and tells her that she had only been knocked out, though she learns the truth anyway from Dorothy; Charlie later agrees to keep her death and subsequent resurrection a secret from Sam so long as Dean agrees to one day explain what had really happened. Charlie and Dorothy eventually devise a way to kill the Witch, but are attacked by Sam and Dean, who are both possessed by the Witch. While Dorothy holds the brothers off, Charlie finds and kills the Witch by stabbing in the head with Oz's famous ruby slippers before the Witch can let her army in through a portal to Oz. When Dorothy extends an offer to Charlie to come with her to Oz, Charlie jumps at the prospect of finally getting the kind of magic and adventure she wants. After bidding their goodbyes to the brothers, Charlie and Dorothy cross over to Oz, leaving Sam and Dean to speculate if and when they will come back.

In the season 10 episode "There's No Place Like Home", Sam and Dean find out that Charlie is back from Oz and is attacking people who helped cover up her parents deaths. To their surprise, they find there are two Charlie's, a good and a dark Charlie. The good Charlie explains that she and Dorothy fought a war in Oz to free it from evil and to win, Charlie made a deal with the Wizard of Oz to split herself into her good and dark sides. Charlie's dark side single-handedly won the war and Dorothy and the Wizard now lead Oz. Now, dark Charlie has come to Earth seeking revenge for her parents deaths, good Charlie following to stop her. As dark Charlie broke the Key to Oz so Charlie couldn't return, she and Sam investigate the Key in hopes of finding a way to fix it, and eventually track down a former Man of Letters named Clive Dylan who was trapped in Oz after discovering the Key. Dean meanwhile tries to protect Russell Wellington, the man who killed Charlie's parents, but Dark Charlie tricks Dean, kills Russell, and follows Dean to Clive's house where they fight and he brutally beats her, hurting Good Charlie who is still connected to her. At the same time, Sam and Charlie learn that the Wizard is in fact Clive's dark side, split from him as Charlie's was. Unable to fix the Key and to save Oz, Clive shoots himself to force the Wizard to Earth to heal Clive and save himself. Unable to defeat the Wizard, Clive signals Charlie to shoot him which she hesitantly does, killing Clive and the Wizard. Sam stops Dean from beating Dark Charlie to death and proceeds to reverse the Wizard's spell and reunite the two Charlies. Afterwards, Charlie, unable to return to Oz, decides to dedicate herself to finding a way to save Dean from the Mark of Cain and forgives his actions.

Charlie returns to the brothers several episodes later, having found an ancient book known as the Book of the Damned, which is said to document every curse as well as their cures. Upon acquiring the book, a group of unknown men, all with the same tattoo on their wrist, begin to pursue her. After a violent encounter with them, Charlie is shot but narrowly escapes, and calls the Winchesters from a telephone booth, informing them of her discovery and injury, mentioning she sewed it back together with dental floss, a testament to her resourcefulness. When reunited, Sam and Charlie begin their attempt to decipher the book's text, as it is written in an unknown ancient language, but Dean insists they stop, and destroy the book entirely, worrying that the Mark will cause him to use its information to do evil. Sam and Charlie decide not to destroy it but to put it away in a curse box, which will prevent anyone from tracking it down. Meanwhile, Dean goes to find Charlie's pursuers, who Sam had determined to be members of the historically prominent Styne family. When they attack the house Charlie and the Winchesters had been staying at, Dean instructs Sam to destroy the book before the men can take it. Sam throws the book in the fire, and the trio defeats and kills their attackers. However, it is later revealed he threw another book in, and hid the real book in hopes he could still cure Dean, despite his brother's wishes. When Charlie, Sam and Dean return to the bunker, they are greeted by Castiel, and Charlie is excited to meet him for the first time. Upon hugging him, she comments she had expected him to be shorter. At Charlie's joking request, Castiel heals her carpal tunnel and even her bullet wound without being asked, having gotten his full power back. The four then have a dinner, laughing and enjoying each other's company.

In "Dark Dynasty", Charlie is called in by Sam to work with Rowena on how to translate the Book of the Damned. Charlie is stunned that Sam lied about destroying the Book and reluctantly agrees to work on translating the Book behind Dean's back. However, Charlie is forced to work with Rowena who annoys her greatly with her disgust at Charlie being a nerd instead of a witch and her insistence that they are similar. Unable to take it anymore, Charlie asks Castiel to let her go cool off for a while and slips out while he ties up Rowena in another room. Going to a motel, Charlie continues her efforts to translate the Book of the Damned and finally manages to crack the code just before Eldon Styne arrives. Charlie contacts Sam and Dean, who tell her to give him the Book which she doesn't have, or her notes to save her life. However, unwilling to betray her friends or give the Styne Family the power of the Book, Charlie smashes her Surface and is killed by Eldon. A devastated Sam and Dean find her body soon afterwards. However, unknown to them, Charlie's last act was to email Sam her notes on how to translate the Book, giving them the chance to finish what she started.

In "The Prisoner", following her death, Sam and Dean cremate Charlie in hunter's tradition and Dean decides to slaughter the Stynes in revenge, telling Sam to stop the work on the Book. Sam initially does until he receives Charlie's email and decides to continue. Dean brutally slaughters the Styne family for what they did to Charlie and ultimately kills Eldon, avenging her.

Apocalypse World Charlie Bradbury
In "Bring 'em Back Alive", Dean encounters an alternate reality version of Charlie who is a resistance fighter on Apocalypse World. This Charlie is shown to share many of the same traits as the Charlie Dean knew, although she is hardened by years of fighting. Still feeling guilty for the death of his Charlie, Dean convinces Arthur Ketch to help him lead a rescue mission for her. As Charlie is to be executed, Dean and Arthur attack the POW camp, killing several angels and liberating the prisoners. Though skeptical of Dean's story, Charlie is convinced by the door between Apocalypse World and Dean's universe. As Dean prepares to return to his own world before the door closes, Ketch chooses to stay behind with Charlie to help the resistance coordinate for Dean's inevitable return with reinforcements. As Dean leaves, Charlie and Ketch battle several angels together using guns loaded with angel-killing bullets.

The alternate universe version of Charlie appears again in "Exodus", where Charlie meets Sam, who initially mistakes her for his reality's version of Charlie. Charlie and Ketch are captured by angels in a trap and about to be tortured for information by the evil alternate universe version of Castiel, but they are rescued by Sam, Dean, Jack and Castiel. Charlie then escapes into Sam and Dean's reality with the rest of her group where they then celebrate in the Bunker. In "Let the Good Times Roll" it is revealed in a conversation between Mary and alternate Bobby that Rowena and Charlie are "road-tripping it through the Southwest" together.

Charlie reappears in season 14's "Optimism" where she goes on a hunt with Sam. Charlie reveals that she plans to retire after the hunt and highlights the many differences between herself and the Charlie of the Winchesters' world, including this Charlie finding and losing the love of her life during the Apocalypse. Charlie paints a grim picture of the Apocalypse in the world she came from for Sam and something of a lack of faith in humanity as a result. Working together, Sam and Charlie kill an insectoid monster called a Musca and save its latest victim. Sam convinces Charlie to at least reconsider abandoning the fight altogether after the hunt is over.

Claire Novak
Claire Novak, portrayed as a child by Sydney Imbeau and later in the series as a young adult by Kathryn Newton, is the daughter of Jimmy and Amelia Novak. She is raised in Pontiac, Illinois, until roughly the age of eleven, when her mother disappears, overwhelmed by grief of her father's death. Claire is then left in the custody of her grandmother until her death, at which point she is moved between numerous foster homes and eventually placed in a juvenile center.

Eight-year-old Claire is first introduced, along with her mother, in the season four episode "The Rapture", where the story of Jimmy becoming Castiel's vessel is revealed. Her first appearance occurs after Castiel is shown taking possession of Jimmy. Claire runs outside frantically and asks "Daddy?" to which Castiel replies that he is not her father, and begins to walk away, as she watches him leave. A year later when Castiel is forced out of Jimmy's body, Jimmy is able to return and begins to try and rebuild his life with his family. This is short lived, as demons learn about Jimmy, and take his wife and daughter hostage.

Claire is possessed by Castiel when her parents, Dean, and Sam Winchester, are held captive by demons, her mother having been possessed so that the demons could watch Jimmy and determine his unique qualities as a vessel. Castiel, in Claire's body, expels two demons from their hosts during the fight. Castiel intends to let Jimmy die so that he will go to Heaven and be at peace as a reward for his service, but Jimmy begs Castiel to use him as a vessel and free his daughter. Castiel obliges.

Seven years later, Castiel is inspired to look into Jimmy Novak's old life after recent events with Hannah. He discovers that Claire is in solitary confinement in a juvenile center after attempting the latest of a series of escapes, prompting him to visit and get her out by posing as Jimmy. Claire reveals that her mother vanished after leaving her with her grandmother, and she has been in and out of homes since her grandmother's death, blaming Castiel for breaking her family apart by taking her father as a vessel. Castiel helps her escape the center, but Claire steals his wallet and runs away again to rejoin with Dustin and Randy, friends of hers who were expecting her to collect money to help settle Randy's gambling debts.

The Winchesters and Castiel arrive in time to prevent the robbery, but Claire leaves them in disgust, declaring that Dustin and Randy are her family while the three men are just the people who killed her father. However, when Randy's loan shark offers to take Claire to compensate for the debt, Randy agrees, forcing the Winchesters and Castiel to step in and save her. They arrive at the house and are surprised to not see her, but when they hear screams coming from upstairs, they know she is in fact in the house, and in danger. Castiel locates her and busts down the door of the room where the loan shark is attempting to rape her.

Despite the Winchesters and Castiel saving her, Claire makes it clear that she still doesn't trust them, and resists Castiel's efforts to help her. After being brought to the bunker, she runs away, and meets a couple who suggest that she kill Dean as the person responsible for her father's death, helping them arrange a trap for him. However, she tips Dean off at the last minute, finding herself unable to go through with the plan, and he manages to fight them off and spare their lives despite the corrupting influence of the Mark of Cain. Although Claire still intends to leave Castiel and find a new life on her own, she suggests that she would not be against him keeping in touch with her.

Months later, in "Angel Heart", Claire is now eighteen and has begun searching for her long-missing mother, tracking her to Tulsa, Oklahoma. Claire confronts Ronnie Cartwright, the last person to see her mother and is knocked unconscious. As Castiel is in the emergency contacts on her cell phone, the hospital calls him and he calls in Sam and Dean to help him deal with her. After learning what she is up to, the Winchesters and Castiel decide to help her but she escapes the hospital and returns to her motel room where she finds Sam waiting for her while Dean and Castiel have gone to interrogate Ronnie. Sam offers to help Claire hack her mother's credit card records which she is intrigued by and with what they learn from that combined with what Castiel and Dean learn from Ronnie, they track Amelia to a farm run by a faith healer named Peter Holloway. However, Dean and Claire are left behind as they don't want Claire getting hurt and the Mark of Cain's influence on Dean is getting worse. While initially awkward for Dean and Claire, they bond over mini-golf and Claire inadvertently gives Dean a clue that they aren't dealing with a normal angel. Searching through the lore, Claire discovers that Holloway is a Grigori, a class of angel that preys on humanity. When they are unable to reach Sam and Castiel, Dean allows Claire to join him in the rescue, even giving her a gun. Claire and Dean find Castiel who has rescued a weak Amelia. Claire and her mother are finally reunited and Claire tearfully embraces her rather than berating her like she'd planned. While Claire tries to help Amelia out of the barn, Holloway, revealed to be Tamiel, comes and tells her that Amelia is beyond saving. Claire attempts to kill him with the gun and when she fails, he tries to kill her. Amelia sacrifices herself to save her daughter, leaving Claire devastated. Sam, Dean and Castiel are unable to defeat Tamiel so Claire kills him herself with his own sword to save them and avenge her mother. The next day, the three decide to send her to Jody Mills until she can get on her feet and she forgives Dean and Castiel for their roles in Jimmy's death, taking with her a gift Castiel gave her for her birthday. Dean takes back the gun, but leaves her Caddyshack and a lore book as he noticed her take Tamiel's sword and realizes she intends to become a hunter. Claire hugs Castiel goodbye, finally accepting him as her new father figure.

She goes to live with Jody Mills and appears in season 11's "Don't You Forget About Me", she is trying to be a hunter but is mentioned to have caused trouble in town, due to her hunting but doesn't face jail because of her adoptive mother being sheriff. As seen in the Winchester's visit, she is still rebellious and tends to cause trouble for her adoptive sister Alex. While she maintains a distancing attitude to them, Dean tells her that Jody is doing her best to care for her and she starts to see his point. When she and Jody are captured by vengeful vampires one of them being Alex's boyfriend, Claire breaks free and protects them as the Winchesters arrive to save them. Claire helps Alex in killing Henry. After the attack, she accepts them as family and even tries to make breakfast though the food was burnt. In subsequent episodes, Claire and Alex are shown to have a much better relationship despite still bickering with each other.

In season 12's "Ladies Drink Free", Claire has become a full-time hunter, but lies to Jody that she is checking out colleges as she feels Jody is holding her back too much when they hunt together as Jody is somewhat overprotective. While hunting a werewolf with Mick Davies of the British Men of Letters, the Winchesters learn that Claire is on the same hunt and they team up together. By posing as a high school student, Claire is able to learn from one of the victims best friend that the girl was dating someone who creeped her friend out. Shortly afterwards, the werewolf attacks Claire in broad daylight and bites her.

Frightened, Claire begs to be killed as she doesn't believe she can control herself when she inevitably transforms, but Sam suggests trying an experimental cure created by the British Men of Letters instead. Though it has never worked on a human, Claire agrees to try it and is left with Mick as the Winchesters go to find the werewolf. As the transformation begins, Claire begs Mick to kill her, but he refuses. The two are attacked by the werewolf who is revealed to be the friendly local bartender, Justin, who abducts Claire. Justin reveals to Claire that he was once part of a peaceful pack, but after it was wiped out by the British Men of Letters, he was driven insane with loneliness and is now seeking out a mate. As Claire struggles with both Justin and her instincts, the Winchesters and Mick arrive thanks to a tracking device Mick planted on Claire. In the fight that follows, a completely feral Claire attacks Dean, but he subdues her. Mick and Sam manage to extract Justin's live blood before killing him and Dean injects Claire with the werewolf cure. Claire experiences excruciating agony over a prolonged period of time before appearing to die. Moments later, Claire's transformation reverses itself and she wakes up completely human. The next morning, Claire calls Jody and leaves her a voicemail telling Jody the truth. Claire decides to keep hunting on her own for the time being, but assures Jody that she is ready now thanks to Jody being her mother.

In "There's Something About Mary" and "Who We Are", Claire appears as one of the British Men of Letters primary targets when they plan to wipe out all of the American hunters. However, the British operation is destroyed by a team of American hunters led by Sam and Jody before this can happen.

In season 13's "Wayward Sisters", a more experienced Claire hunts a small werewolf pack that has kidnapped a young girl. Disguised as a delivery person, Claire single-handedly kills all three werewolves, rescues the girl and returns her to her mother. Afterwards, Claire receives a call from Jody that the Winchesters have disappeared and Jody needs her help. Claire returns to Sioux Falls where she is skeptical of Patience Turner's claims that she has had a vision of Claire's death. With Alex's help, Claire locates dreamwalker Kaia Nieves, only to be attacked by a strange monster. With Jody's help, Claire kills the monster which Kaia reveals comes from an alternate reality known as The Bad Place. With Kaia having been trying to help the Winchesters open a door to another world, Claire realizes that a door to The Bad Place is still open.

Under attack by the creatures, the group flees and links up with Sheriff Donna Hanscum for backup. Due to Patience's vision, Jody convinces a reluctant Claire to stay behind. As Claire bonds with Kaia, she grows worried enough to lead the other girls after Jody and Donna. Claire arrives in time to kill one of the creatures with a flamethrower and save Jody and Donna's lives. Finding the rift on the verge of closing, Jody agrees to allow Claire to go through with Kaia and stop overprotecting her. Claire and Kaia manage to rescue the Winchesters in The Bad Place, but are ambushed by a cloaked figure who throws a spear at Claire, killing Kaia when she saves Claire's life. With a giant monster approaching and the rift about to close, the Winchesters drag a reluctant Claire back through the rift which closes moments later. A devastated Claire is comforted by Jody, the true ending to Patience's vision. Claire is left devastated by losing Kaia and later joins her family for dinner, vowing revenge upon Kaia's killer even if she has to find a way to open another rift to The Bad Place. Unknown to Claire, as she sits down to a dinner, a rift from The Bad Place opens and brings Kaia's killer to the Winchesters world. Kaia's killer is revealed to be the alternate reality version of Kaia from The Bad Place.

In season 14's "The Scar", Jody and the Winchesters track down Kaia's killer while searching for a way to defeat the alternate reality Michael. Having thought a string of recent murders was a human killer, Jody initially keeps Claire out of the case for that reason and then because Claire, who was in love with Kaia, is obsessed with revenge against her killer. After catching Kaia's killer, dubbed Dark Kaia, the three learn of her identity as Kaia's alternate counterpart who admits that Kaia's death was an accident as she was aiming for Claire. After a confrontation with some of Michael's monsters, Dark Kaia escapes after saving the group's life, leaving Jody to wonder how to explain what happened to Claire.

In season 15's "Galaxy Brain", the Winchesters and Jody encounter Dark Kaia yet again who reveals that The Bad Place is dying and that Kaia is in fact still alive, trapped in The Bad Place after surviving her wound. Jody attempts to call Claire to inform her of the development, but can't reach her and they are left with no time to wait for Claire to help them rescue Kaia. Jody tells Castiel that Claire has been obsessed with hunting Dark Kaia for revenge for two years and is ironically out of cellphone range in Yosemite chasing a woman in a black cloak when they finally get Dark Kaia. The two believe that Claire won't survive if she learns that they had a chance to save Kaia and failed to save her and Castiel convinces Jody to remain behind so that Claire doesn't lose her too. With the help of Dark Kaia and Jack, the Winchesters return to The Bad Place and rescue Kaia. Dark Kaia chooses to remain behind in The Bad Place as it is destroyed by God, dying with her homeworld. In the aftermath, Kaia accepts an invitation to return to Sioux Falls with Jody and asks after Claire who Jody promises will be home soon.

Dean Winchester

Donna Hanscum
Sheriff Donna Hanscum (portrayed by Briana Buckmaster) is the sheriff of Stillwater, Minnesota who, while at first oblivious to the supernatural, became a hunter after two encounters with it. She first appears in "The Purge" when Sam and Dean investigate mysterious deaths where overweight people are drained of most of their fat. Donna is portrayed as an overweight woman who has recently been granted a divorce from a man who dumped her for her weight. She helps Sam and Dean early in the investigation, but then goes to a health spa where the owner, a pishtaco, feeds on her fat, causing her to lose ten pounds, something she attributes to fire cupping. Donna, slightly stoned from the roofies she was given, inadvertently blows Sam and Dean's cover at the spa and explains her weight loss to them. After the case is over, Sam and Dean attribute it to a psychopathic serial killer, something Donna accepts.

Several months later, during "Hibbing 911", Donna goes to a sheriff's retreat in Hibbing, Minnesota, her hometown where she meets Sheriff Jody Mills. The two are partnered up during the retreat and Jody tries to keep Donna out of the case where people are completely consumed by an unknown monster except for their bones. In turn, Donna is annoyed when Jody defends her from her husband who is extremely rude to her and unknowingly makes a rude comment about Jody's own lost husband, something Donna immediately regrets when she realizes what she's done. Donna later sees Sam and Dean who Jody called in and is surprised to recognize them while Jody is shocked to realize Donna knows her friends. Donna eventually finds Sheriff Len Cues over another victim and sees that he is a monster, more specifically a vampire, shocking her. She tells Jody about it and they break into Len's room where Donna finds a clue about the location of the vampire's nest. When Sam and Dean arrive, they are forced to tell Donna the truth about what's going on in Hibbing and what happened in Stillwater. Donna insists on going with them and with the support of Jody, she successfully convinces them to let her go along, though she is a bit unsettled at the idea of having to decapitate the vampires to kill them. The group is captured by the vampires and their leader, Starr, explains that Len used to be their leader, having taught them to use all parts of their prey, before growing a conscience and leaving them. The vampires were trying to lure Len back and when he refuses, Starr kills him. Dean breaks free and kills two of the three vampires, but Starr goes after Jody. Donna, who broke one of the lenses of her glasses and used it to cut herself free, decapitates Starr, saving Jody and quipping "Hakuna Matata, lady." Later, Donna discusses the experience with Jody, saying that knowing monsters are out there makes the world seem bigger and darker. Jody, complimenting Donna's actions, offers to train her to be a hunter, something Donna accepts.

Donna later reappears in Plush, calling in the Winchesters after a man in a bunny mask murdered a local man and the mask won't come off. When her deputy, Doug, is forced to kill the young man, Donna is left horrified as the mask appears to be a cursed object, making the young man another innocent victim. Donna burns the mask and it appears to be over, but a young woman in a court jester's outfit attacks the local football coach and the Winchesters learn that they are dealing with an angry ghost, not a cursed object. Dean is able to break the ghost's possession of the young woman and Donna makes up a story and lets her go as she's innocent. As the Winchesters talk to Rita Johnson, the woman who donated all of the possessed costumes, Donna distracts her son Max. Afterwards, the Winchesters inform her it is the ghost of Chester Johnson, a children's performer who committed suicide a couple of months before. When told that they need to locate and burn the costumes, Donna offers to deal with that with Doug. She is later called by Sam after another possessed victim murders the coach who was in a coma. Donna and Doug locate all of the costumes and burn them, but when Donna calls Sam, he learns she never found a deer's head mask. After Chester's spirit is destroyed, Donna visits the Johnson house with Doug and the Winchesters tell her that as she now has three cases under her belt, she is an official hunter to her great joy. After they leave, Donna apologizes to Doug for her treatment of him due to her bad experience with her ex-husband Doug who was also a cop. Doug forgives her, telling Donna he has baggage too and the two are able to joke around with each other comfortably.

Two years later in "Wayward Sisters", Donna is called in by Jody Mills to act as backup to help rescue the Winchesters from the alternate reality known as The Bad Place. Now a full-fledged hunter, Donna is stated to have "killed a lot of vampires" and possesses an impressive arsenal in her truck. Donna helps figure out the location of the rift between worlds and battles creatures from The Bad Place alongside Jody, her daughter Alex, Claire Novak and Patience Turner. After the rescue is successful, Donna sits down to dinner with Jody's family.

A few weeks later in "Breakdown", Donna's niece Wendy goes missing. Even though all signs point to a human bad guy, Donna calls the Winchesters for help and they come to her aid alongside Doug who is now her boyfriend. The group determines that Wendy has been kidnapped by a serial abductor called the Butterfly and work together with FBI agent Terrance Clegg to try to solve the case. Along the way, Donna is forced to tell Doug the truth about monsters and her hunting lifestyle when they discover that the victims are being chopped up and sold as parts for monsters. After Doug gets turned into a vampire, Donna kneecaps his sire and forces him to divulge the location of the harvesting operation while Dean manages to cure Doug. Donna then rescues Wendy, killing the Butterfly's accomplice in the process while Dean rescues Sam and kills the Butterfly, who was Agent Clegg all along. In the aftermath, while Doug acknowledges the necessity of Donna's hunting, he becomes frightened by what he has seen and breaks up with Donna, leaving her heartbroken.

In season 14's "Nightmare Logic", Mary Winchester and the alternate Bobby Singer retreat to Donna's cabin for some down time following a hunt that brings up bad memories for Bobby.

In "Damaged Goods", Dean visits with Donna on his way to her cabin to see his mother. Donna tells him that her breakup with Doug has been hard on her with Doug leaving the police force and going into private security. Donna notices Dean's strange behavior and realizes that something is wrong. Later, a suspicious grocery store clerk calls Donna about Nick searching for Mary. Donna pulls Nick over in a stolen van and learns from Nick's fingerprints about Nick being wanted for his murder spree. Nick knocks Donna out with a stun gun and learns Mary's location from Donna's cell phone, but leaves her unconscious in the front seat of her police car rather than harming her further. Upon waking up, Donna calls Dean and warns him of the threat Nick poses. Donna's police department helps them track down Nick through his stolen van and Donna acts as a police escort to the storage unit where Nick is unleashing Abraxas. After Nick kills Abraxas, Donna shoots Nick in the leg to keep him from harming Mary and arrests Nick for his murder spree.

Eileen Leahy
Eileen Leahy, portrayed by Shoshannah Stern, is an Irish hunter and Men of Letters Legacy.

In 1985, when Eileen was a baby, a Banshee attacked her house and murdered her parents. Before dying, Eileen's mother managed to banish the Banshee with a spell, saving Eileen's life but leaving her deaf. Eileen was eventually found and raised by a hunter named Lillian O'Grady who died of cancer when Eileen was sixteen.

In "Into the Mystic", Eileen tracks the Banshee that killed her parents to a retirement home in Kansas where she encounters the Winchesters. Disguised as a maid, Eileen comes to the mistaken impression that the Winchesters are Banshees and attacks Sam before they can sort it all out. The Winchesters learn that Eileen's grandfather was a Man of Letters, making her a Legacy like them. With the help of the Winchesters and Mildred Barker, Eileen finally kills the Banshee and get her revenge. However, Eileen decided to remain a hunter rather than return to a normal life.

In "The British Invasion", Eileen's help was enlisted by the Winchesters in finding Kelly Kline. Eileen eventually tracked down a demon working for the Prince of Hell Dagon and got Kelly's phone number from him before killing the demon with an angel blade. Eileen took part in the mission to capture Kelly Kline and attempted to kill Dagon with the Colt. However, Eileen missed and accidentally killed British Men of Letters operative Renny Rawlings. The Winchesters stop Mick Davies from killing a distraught Eileen and she chose to return to Ireland for a while, but not before leaving the Winchesters the Colt.

In "There's Something About Mary", Eileen is killed by a hellhound loyal to British Men of Letters assassin Arthur Ketch in South Carolina. The Winchesters learn of Eileen's death from Jody Mills and are confused and suspicious as Eileen is supposed to be in Ireland. They later receive a letter sent by Eileen four days before her death stating she believed that the British Men of Letters were following her and tapping her computer and phone. Eileen's letter causes the Winchesters to check the bunker and find Arthur Ketch's monitoring equipment. After capturing Lady Toni Bevell, the Winchesters question whether the British operation is responsible for Eileen's death. While Toni doesn't know who Eileen is, she confirms the high likelihood that she was killed by the British Men of Letters, stating that if the organization is suspected of killing someone, they likely did.

In season 15's "Golden Time", Eileen returns as a ghost, revealing that the hellhound dragged her soul to Hell when she was killed. Having escaped from Hell when God released all of the souls of Hell upon the world, Eileen seeks Sam and Dean's help in getting into Heaven, knowing that she will eventually go insane as a ghost. However, the Winchesters have learned that once a soul has been condemned to Hell, it cannot enter Heaven. Instead, Dean sends Sam to seek out Rowena's journals so they can create a Soul Catcher to contain Eileen. At Rowena's apartment, Sam discovers a spell Rowena had created to resurrect Mary Winchester which he realizes will work on Eileen also. After witches attack, Eileen is banished, but gets Dean to help Sam. Eileen battles a witch's ghost until Dean puts the witch's soul to rest. Afterwards, Sam uses Rowena's spell to resurrect Eileen.

Ellen Harvelle

Garth Fitzgerald IV
Garth Fitzgerald IV, portrayed by DJ Qualls, is a hunter who generally works alone, although he has teamed up with the Winchester brothers on two occasions. Since Bobby's death and Sam and Dean's subsequent year-long absence, he has taken on Bobby's role as hunter coordinator, although he remains mobile where Bobby maintained a 'home base', carrying various cell phones around with him; he has even started wearing Bobby's hat and attempting to imitate Bobby's old phrases, although this has met with variable success. As part of this, he has started to track hunters via the GPS in their cell phones and assign them cases, something that creeps Sam out but Dean says is "very Bobby." Garth reveals that before he became a hunter, he was working to become a dentist and killed the Tooth Fairy on his first case.

Garth eventually disappears sometime after "Taxi Driver" and is found by Sam and Dean in "Sharp Teeth" where he reveals that he was turned into a werewolf on a hunt two months before his disappearance and hid it. Garth has joined a pack of werewolves that peacefully coexist with humans and married one named Bess. After Sam and Dean find him, he introduces them to the pack and tries to convince them that everything is fine, however, members of the pack worship Fenris and want to rule over humanity. To this end, they kidnap, Garth, Bess and Sam, planning to murder Garth and Bess and frame Sam and Dean to goad the pack into returning to their old beliefs and bring about Ragnarok. Before the plot can be carried out, Dean comes to their rescue and kills the three werewolves involved. In the aftermath, Garth, who is upset to learn of Kevin's death and blames himself as he wasn't there for him, offers to return to hunting using his new powers to help fight. However, Dean recognizes that not all of the werewolves are bad and tells Garth to stay with his new family where he has found happiness.

Needing help to discover Michael's plans, Garth returns in "The Spear", offering to go undercover and infiltrate the rogue Archangel's ranks as a werewolf seeking an enhancement. Having been briefed by Sam, he intended to fake taking the serum, but is later forced to consume it. Overwhelmed, he later attacks the approaching hunters, forcing Sam to subdue him and lock Garth in the Impala's trunk. Sam suggests that Michael was spying on them through his connection to Garth and they hope that killing Michael will free Garth from his control. Garth remains locked in the trunk throughout "Nihilism" with subsequent events preventing the original plan to retrieve Garth until after Michael is defeated and locked away in Dean's mind.

In season 15's "The Heroes' Journey", Garth calls the Winchesters in for help after Bess' cousin Brad is found badly wounded by a Wraith. Garth is shown to have three children and named the youngest two after Sam and Castiel. With Sam and Dean now experiencing normal people problems, Garth and Bess help treat Dean's seventeen cavities and Sam's illness, Garth having become a dentist since he retired. After learning of the war with God, Garth suggests that as Sam and Dean were the heroes of God's story, he had protected them from such mundane issues but has since downgraded them to normal people since the Winchesters have fallen out of favor with God. Though Garth guesses that he's only a special guest star in the story, he suggests that its better than being the hero. When the Winchesters go after the monster fight club, they leave Garth behind rather than risk his normal life. However, Garth later shows up to rescue them, infiltrating the fight club and using C4 to blow it all up. This and Garth saving them from the massive vampire Maul causes the Winchesters to suggest that Garth is the hero of the story this time. Garth directs the Winchesters to a place he has heard rumors of in Alaska where they might be able to regain their normal abilities and dances with Bess as they drive away.

Gordon Walker
Gordon Walker, portrayed by Sterling K. Brown, is a vampire hunter whose methods often put him at odds with the Winchester brothers. Gordon focuses on eliminating the supernatural simply because it isn't human, where the Winchesters are more willing to tolerate supernatural entities that are not actively killing humans. Gordon takes pleasure in considering himself a killer who freely resorts to torture, where Sam and Dean regard themselves as Hunters who only kill when they must and do nothing to their enemies that the situation doesn't force upon them.

When Gordon was 18 years old, a vampire broke into his house and abducted his sister. Gordon ran away from home, learned how to fight, hunt, and kill vampires, and tracked down the vampire who had taken his sister. He killed the vampire, and his sister, who had been turned, marking the beginning of his hatred for the undead. At some point during his career as a hunter, Gordon met John Winchester and Ellen Harvelle. Ellen described him as a skilled hunter in the sense that Hannibal Lecter is a good psychiatrist, being good at his job but dangerous to everyone else around him.

Gordon is introduced in the episode "Bloodlust", meeting up with Sam and Dean while hunting a nest of vampires. At first, Dean bonds with Gordon, but Gordon proves himself to be bloodthirsty and sadistic as he tortures one of the captured vampires, even though he knows these particular vampires feed off cattle blood and do not kill humans. After Gordon tries to force one of the vampires to drink Sam's blood while torturing her with dead man's blood, Dean, seeing the vampire resist the urge, ends up beating Gordon in a fight and leaves Gordon tied to a chair while the vampires escape. Later, while performing an exorcism, Gordon learns about the coming demonic war, Azazel's special children, and Sam's powers. In "Hunted", he kills Scott Carey- another of the 'special children'- and then tracks Sam down and tries to kill him, convinced that Sam and those like him are 'traitors' to humanity. However, Dean intervenes, and, after a scuffle, Gordon knocks Dean out, ties him up, and uses him as bait to catch Sam in a booby trap of grenades set with trip wires. Sam manages to evade the trap and knocks Gordon out. As the brothers leave the damaged house, Gordon regains consciousness and chases them, firing two pistols in their direction. The police arrive to subdue Gordon, based on an anonymous tip from Sam, and find his cache of weapons in his car.

In "Bad Day at Black Rock", Gordon is shown to be in prison, where he convinces a visiting fellow hunter to go after Sam Winchester, convinced that Sam was involved in the opening of the Devil's Trap regardless of Bobby's claims that Sam was actually trying to stop it. Gordon eventually escapes from prison and, once again, pursues the Winchester brothers in "Fresh Blood". However, he is captured and subsequently turned by a vampire. Gordon, however, turns on his sire, kills two other vampires, and then sets up a trap for the Winchester brothers, still convinced it is his duty as a hunter to rid the world of Sam Winchester. A fight ensues in a warehouse where Gordon holds a girl he has kidnapped—and turned—to use as bait, ending with Sam decapitating him with a garotte improvised out of razor wire.

According to series creator Eric Kripke, Gordon was originally going to learn about the hunter Sam killed while possessed and use it to convince more hunters to turn against Sam. This was intended to be a story arc stretching over multiple episodes. However, Sterling K. Brown was contracted for the Lifetime Television series Army Wives, and Lifetime would only allow him to return to Supernatural for two more episodes.

Gwen Campbell
Gwen Campbell, portrayed by Jessica Heafey, is a hunter and third cousin related to Sam and Dean's mother's side of the family. When Sam re-enters Dean's life in "Exile on Main Street", he reveals that he has been back for a year and hunting with the Campbells, including Gwen. She and the others assist the brothers in defeating a Djinn. Gwen is present at the compound in "Two and a Half Men" when the brothers arrive with a baby Shapeshifter, and is overpowered, along with the others, when the Alpha Shapeshifter arrives. When hunting the Alpha Vampire in "Family Matters", she is ordered to stay behind and flush out any stragglers with Dean. She and Dean fight well together, and she covers for Dean when he disobeys orders. However, she sides with Samuel at the end of the episode when she holds the Winchesters at gunpoint, and follows him even when it is revealed that he has been working for Crowley. She is next seen in "...And Then There Were None", hunting with Samuel. While investigating a series of murders, they encounter Bobby, Rufus, Sam and Dean. Gwen tells Dean that she did not know that Samuel had betrayed them to Crowley. The creature responsible for the deaths—dubbed the Khan Worm—infects Dean, who kills Gwen.

Henry Winchester
Henry Winchester, played by Gil McKinney, is John Winchester's father, Sam and Dean's grandfather and a member of the secret society known as the Men of Letters. Vanishing in 1958, Henry was believed by his son to have run out on his family.

In Supernatural
In "As Time Goes By", on August 12, 1958, the night of Henry's official initiation into the Men of Letters, the order is attacked by the demon Abaddon who is possessing Henry's friend Josie Sands. As the demon slaughters everyone else, Henry is given a mysterious box by surviving Men of Letters Elder Larry Ganem and ordered to protect it from Abaddon. Escaping through time, Henry ends up coming out of his grandsons' motel room closet in the year 2013, having overshot his attempt to get help from John closer to his own time. Henry's arrival and search for John creates much confusion for the Winchesters who only knew of him as their grandfather who had supposedly run out on John when he was four. Henry reveals to Sam and Dean their family's history with the Men of Letters, a family legacy going back centuries that the Winchesters had been unaware of as Henry hadn't been around to pass it on to John and the order had been wiped out by Abaddon. However, Henry expresses disgust that his grandsons are hunters due to having a low view of hunters in general. Learning of his son's fate, Henry attempts to travel back in time and change things, but he is stopped by Dean. At the same time, Sam learns from Larry Ganem that the box contains a key that opens a veritable supernatural treasure trove that must never fall into Abaddon's hands. After the demon captures Sam, Dean agrees to trade Henry and the box for Sam, but the two men conspire together to defeat the demon. Henry is able to trap Abaddon in Josie's body with a devil's trap bullet to the head, but he is mortally wounded in the process. Unable to kill the powerful demon, Dean takes advantage of Henry trapping her to cut the demon up and bury the pieces to forever entomb her. Henry dies in his grandsons' arms, content with his own sacrifice, apologizing for his earlier disgust of them being hunters and proclaiming that as long as the Winchesters are still around, there's still hope. He also expresses his pride in John, confident that he was a good man based on what he saw in Sam and Dean. Sam and Dean bury Henry near his friends from the Men of Letters and decide to embrace the family legacy that Henry had introduced to them.

In "Everybody Hates Hitler", the Winchesters locate the Men of Letters bunker, the place that the key Henry was guarding opens and it becomes their new base of operations.

In "Blade Runners", Sam and Dean get the attention of expelled Man of Letters Cuthbert "Magnus" Sinclair by revealing that they are Henry's grandsons. Magnus reveals that before his expulsion from the Men of Letters in 1956, he was Henry's mentor in the order. Calling Henry something of a rebel, Magnus comments that Henry would continue to visit him even after he was kicked out.

In "Mother's Little Helper", shortly before their initiation into the Men of Letters, Henry and Josie are sent to investigate possible demonic possessions at a convent. This field mission is their final test before their official initiation, but Henry expresses doubts about joining the order and the dangers that come with it. It's also implied that Josie harbors unrequited romantic feelings for Henry. Unbeknownst to Henry and Josie, several of the nuns, including the Mother Superior, are possessed by Abaddon and her followers who are stealing souls for their own purposes. Henry and Josie manage to exorcise two of the demons, but prove to be no match for Abaddon who knocks Henry out. Josie manages to convince the Knight of Hell to possess her instead of Henry and the surviving demons fake a win by Henry and Josie. In reality, Abaddon plots to infiltrate and then destroy the Men of Letters. Unaware of the truth, Henry departs with Abaddon, his faith in his purpose renewed. In the present, Sam learns of these events from a nun who had witnessed what had happened and connects it to his grandfather. Confronting and killing the other remaining demon from 1958, Sam learns that the demons had been stealing souls to create their own demon army loyal only to Abaddon.

In "King of the Damned", Abaddon incapacities Crowley with a devil's trap bullet, something that she credits to learning from Henry. Abaddon also uses the time travel spell that Henry had used to escape to 2013 to kidnap Crowley's son Gavin from the past as leverage against him. In the fight that follows, Dean finally kills Abaddon with the First Blade, avenging Henry's death.

In "Family Feud", Sam mentions that Henry had previously used the spell when the Winchesters prepare to use it to return Gavin to his own time.

In "Lebanon", when a time displaced John from 2003 appears in the bunker, Sam and Dean tell him the truth about what had happened to his father and that Henry would likely be really happy to see John in the bunker.

In The Winchesters
In "Pilot", on March 23, 1972, John returns home from fighting in the Vietnam War, having managed to enlist underage by forging Henry's signature on a waiver. During his trip home, a man mysteriously appeared and then disappeared after giving John a letter from Henry telling John that if John has gotten this letter, then Henry is gone. However, there is a dangerous world out there and that the Winchester family has been involved in fighting that danger for centuries. Henry's letter provides John with an address that promises to hold the answers that John seeks and a key to it. The address turns out to be a Men of Letters clubhouse in Lawrence, Kansas where John recovers a number of his father's belongings from Henry's locker and finds himself drawn into the hunting life and the Men of Letters' fight against the Akrida. Henry's wife and John's mother Millie later admits that she knew the truth about Henry's work as a Man of Letters, but had kept it from John to protect him. Ada Monroe tells John that she knew Henry who had once come to her looking for a book about Wraiths. However, Ada doesn't know what happened to Henry or the other Men of Letters who had vanished in 1958.

In "Reflections," the Monster Club discovers notes on the Ostium and the Akrida in Henry's handwriting. In order to gain more information on the box, they summon Henry's ghost who finally gets to say goodbye to his family. Henry reveals how to recharge the Ostium using a piece of rock from the Akrida's home universe that Henry had hidden just in case the Akrida ever returned. However, their attempt to defeat the Akrida fails as they are unable to find the Akrida Queen.

In "Cast Your Fate to the Wind," John recognizes the man who gave him Henry's letter in one of Samuel Campbell's photographs. The man is revealed to be Dean Winchester, John's son and Henry's grandson.

In "Suspicious Minds," John and Mary, while dealing with former Man of Letters Jack Wilcox, discover that he was kicked out of the order because Henry had exposed him for illegal human experimentation.

In "Hey, That's No Way To Say Goodbye," in a flashback, Dean gives John Henry's letter, much to the admonishment of Bobby Singer as they're not supposed to interfere. It remains unclear how Dean got the letter, but he simply tells Bobby that it was meant for John and he is just nudging things along. The Akrida Queen, Joan Hopkins, reveals that, after the Men of Letters defeated the Akrida in 1957, she had used the last of her power to kill them all, including Henry. After the destruction of the Akrida, Dean reveals to his parents that they are actually in an alternate universe and that they and Henry are not the John, Mary and Henry from Supernatural but their alternate counterparts.

Jesse and Cesar Cuevas
Jesse and Cesar Cuevas, portrayed by Valin Shinyei and Hugo Ateo respectively are a pair of married hunters appearing in season 11.

In a flashback to 1989 in Gunnison, Colorado in "The Chitters", a twelve-year old Jesse witnesses his older brother Matty get taken by monsters. In the present day, Jesse and his husband Cesar appear in time to save Dean from the same monsters who Jesse identifies as Bisaan, Malaysian cicada spirits who emerge every twenty-seven years to possess people and breed. Driven by a need for revenge for the loss of his brother, Jesse has returned with Cesar to hunt the monsters down. Cesar privately admits to Dean that if they don't get the Bisaan, Jesse is willing to wait another twenty-seven years for his chance. On Sam's suggestion, Jesse and Sam visit the former sheriff while Dean and Cesar hunt down the burrow. Jesse and Sam learn from the sheriff that he had managed to track down the Bisaan, but discovered his daughter to be one of them. After being forced to kill his daughter in self-defense and believing the monsters to be dying, the sheriff lied to cover the whole thing up. He gives Sam and Jesse the location of the burrow which is located by Dean and Cesar at the same time. The two hunters find the pregnant mothers already dead and are attacked by the two surviving Bisaan. Dean and Cesar kill the creatures through decapitation and end the nightmare. By the time Jesse arrives, the Bisaan are already dead, but he is allowed to be the one to burn the eggs to ensure the cycle will never repeat itself again.

In the Bisaan lair, Jesse discovers his brother's remains along with the corpses of all of the Bisaan's other victims. While the Winchesters deal with the other corpses, Jesse gives Matty a Hunter's Funeral and is finally able to lay his past to rest. Though the Winchesters consider asking Jesse and Cesar for help against the Darkness, the two men reveal that they are retiring from the life, having planned for the Bisaan hunt to be their last if they succeeded. Jesse and Cesar tell the Winchesters they have bought a horse farm in New Mexico they will retire to and Jesse is also a former EMT if they need another source of income. Sam and Dean choose to let the two men leave, agreeing that a hunter who gets their revenge and actually decides to leave the life deserves to have that chance.

Jo Harvelle

Jody Mills

John Winchester

Lily Sunder
Lily Sunder, portrayed by Alicia Witt, is a professor of apocalyptic literature turned angel hunter appearing in season 12. She reappears in season 14 portrayed by Veronica Cartwright.

In the late-nineteenth to early-twentieth century, Lily worked as a professor of apocalyptic literature and was fascinated by angels. She eventually found a spell to summon one, Ishim, who taught her the secrets of the angels. However, Ishim grew dangerously obsessed with Lily. Recognizing that Ishim was a monster, Lily left him and married the Seraphim Akobel for protection. However, in 1901, Ishim came after her for revenge. Accompanied by the angels Benjamin, Mirabel, Castiel and two others, Ishim arrived under the pretense that Lily's daughter May was a Nephilim that had to be killed. Akobel ordered Lily to run while he confronted the angels and was killed. Ishim faced Lily alone and murdered May in front of her before leaving Lily alive. Desiring revenge, Lily began using Enochian magic to give herself immortality and various powers at the cost of parts of her soul burning away each time she used them. After the Fall of the Angels in 2013, Lily took advantage of the angels' weakened state to kill two of Ishim's garrison that had participated in murdering her family over the next few years.

In 2017, in "Lily Sunder Has Some Regrets", Lily confronts Benjamin in an arcade and engages the angel in battle. After allowing Benjamin to put out a distress call, Lily kills him with an angel blade. Lily next confronts Mirabel outside of a diner where she is meeting with Ishim and Castiel, Lily's last targets. Lily quickly kills Mirabel and turns her attention to Ishim when he emerges. Lily's new powers grant her immunity to Ishim's smiting and she wounds him, but the fight is interrupted by the Winchesters and Castiel. After being wounded herself and not wanting to harm humans, Lily uses a blast of white light to blind everyone and flees in a rental car to her hotel where she heals her injuries.

After learning the story of what happened in 1901, the Winchesters track Lily down through her rental car to try to convince her not to go after Castiel. Learning that they believe May to have been a Nephilim, Lily tells them the truth about what happened. Sam and Dean believe her and Dean goes off to find Castiel while Lily stays with Sam and convinces him of the threat Ishim poses to Dean. Lily and Sam arrive as Ishim prepares to kill Dean and Lily engages Ishim in battle. Even aided by the Winchesters Lily proves to be no match for Ishim who fights through her telekinesis and prepares to kill her with his angel blade. To Lily's shock, she's saved by Castiel who kills Ishim from behind with his angel blade. Though Lily gets her revenge with Ishim's death, she is left unsure of whether or not she can let go of her vengeance against Castiel due to revenge being all she's had for over a century. Castiel apologizes to Lily and promises that if she finds she can't forgive him and wants to come after him for revenge again one day, he will be waiting for her. In tears, Lily thanks Castiel and departs, presumably off to start a new life.

In "Byzantium", Sam calls Lily for help in hopes that she can translate Kevin Tran's notes on the angel tablet and find a way to bring back the deceased Jack. Now elderly as she has stopped using the magic that prolonged her life, Lily can't read the tablet notes but offers a way to save Jack using her Enochian magic which will allow Jack's own soul to sustain him. In return, Lily asks that the Winchesters ensure her admittance into Heaven, explaining that she still has a sliver of her soul left and wishes to be reunited with her daughter when she dies. The Winchesters summon Anubis who weighs Lily's soul and determines that she will go to Hell. Anubis explains that only a person's choices determine their final destination and he can't change Lily's fate. Despite this setback, Dean convinces Lily to help them so that they won't have to experience the loss of a child as she did. Lily succeeds in helping to resurrect Jack and to cure his condition.

Moments after Jack's resurrection, Lily suffers a fatal heart attack and quietly dies. In the afterlife, Lily is greeted by Anubis who again weighs her soul and determines that Lily can now enter Heaven. Lily is implied to have known that helping Jack would be fatal to her and helped anyway and that this selfless action changed her fate. Anubis sends Lily's soul off to be reunited with her daughter at long last with Lily smiling in happiness and peace.

Mary Winchester
Mary Winchester (née Campbell) regularly portrayed by Samantha Smith but depicted by Amy Gumenick in the time-travel episodes "In the Beginning" and "The Song Remains the Same" while a younger version played by Meg Donnelly appeared in the sequel series The Winchesters, is the wife of John Winchester and mother of Sam and Dean. She was born in 1954 to Samuel and Deanna Campbell, who were hunters, and she was raised into a life of hunting.

In Supernatural
Dean, sent back in time by the angel Castiel, unknowingly brings Mary to Azazel's attention through his actions. Azazel kills her parents and then-boyfriend John Winchester, after which he bargains with Mary for John's life, offering to resurrect John if she allows him to enter her house ten years later. Not knowing Azazel's intentions, she agrees, eventually marrying John and leaving the life of a hunter. Sometime afterward, when she is pregnant with Dean, the adult Dean and Sam visit her again to warn her of Anna Milton, who intends to kill Mary before she could give birth to her sons and thus avert the Apocalypse. She is successfully protected when Michael possesses John to kill Anna, then erases Mary's memories so history remains the same. In 1980, Mary briefly returns to hunting to "tie up some loose ends." This includes traveling to Manitoba, Canada and killing a werewolf that she has some kind of history with. In the process, Mary saves the life of a young boy named Asa Fox, inspiring him to become a legendary hunter in the process.

In the pilot episode, six months after Sam's birth in 1983, Mary was awakened by sounds of him crying in his crib. She discovered Azazel there - later revealed to have been feeding Sam his demonic blood - and confronted him, but was pinned to the ceiling by him and slashed across her abdomen, eventually bursting into flames. According to "The Kids Are Alright", Azazel then killed all of her remaining friends and acquaintances, presumably so her children would not have any leads as to her death. It is revealed in "Home" that Mary has been acting as a guardian spirit of the Winchesters' old home in Lawrence, Kansas. She fights the poltergeist haunting the house and forces both spirits to leave.

As a thank-you gift for making her and God reconcile in "Alpha and Omega", the Darkness brings back Mary as she appeared at the time of her death. She is informed by Dean about the events that transpired in the 33 years since her death; to her dismay, she learns that John is dead and that her efforts to protect her family from the hunter world are futile.

In season 12, Mary struggles to adapt to the world that has changed greatly from what she once knew and the changes in her sons. Mary's struggle leads her to isolate herself from her children while her desire to create a world free of monsters leads to Mary allying with the British Men of Letters, particularly their top assassin Arthur Ketch. Mary is shown to be a hunter with formidable skills, described by Arthur as the best hunter he has ever seen. Mary herself states that she was good at hunting before she gave the life up. Mary's association with the British Men of Letters leads to her being brainwashed into a mindless assassin used to kill the American hunters. After being captured by Jody Mills, Mary's brainwashing is broken by Dean with the help of Lady Toni Bevell in time for Mary to kill Arthur Ketch and save Dean's life. Reunited with her children, Mary attends to Kelly Kline as she gives birth to Lucifer's Nephilim son Jack and sacrifices herself to trap Lucifer in the alternate reality known as Apocalypse World, trapping herself with him.

In season 13, Mary is trapped in Apocalypse World while her sons attempt to rescue her. Originally trapped with Lucifer, Mary is captured and tortured by the archangel Michael, the ruler of Apocalypse World. An attempt by her sons to rescue her leads to Lucifer's son Jack being trapped with Mary as well. Working together, Jack and Mary escape Michael's fortress and link up with some of the surviving human population led by Bobby Singer. While reminiscing with Bobby about her deceased counterpart, Mary learns that in Apocalypse World, her counterpart never made the deal with Azazel to bring back John as seen in season 4's "In The Beginning." Mary realizes that as a result, Sam and Dean never existed to stop the Apocalypse and receives comfort from Bobby that her own decision to make the deal was in fact the right one after all. Mary helps defend Bobby's colony against an angel attack led by Zachariah and together with Jack, forms a resistance against Michael as learned by Dean and a resurrected Arthur Ketch when they briefly visit Apocalypse World in "Bring 'em Back Alive".

Mary eventually returns to the original world with the refugees from 'Apocalypse World', forming a tentative relationship with the alternate Bobby as they attempt to fight the threat of the alternate Michael as he attempts to take Dean as his vessel. She is later reunited with John for a brief time when a magical wish brings John forward through time from 2003. Michael is eventually defeated when Jack banishes him, but Jack begins to damage his soul as he taps into his powers after a confrontation with Lucifer, which results in him killing Mary by accident. His attempt to bring Mary back to life only restores her body, and when Castiel goes to Heaven to retrieve her soul, he learns that she has been reunited with John Winchester in Heaven, prompting Castiel to let Mary stay dead so she can be with him.

According to series creator Eric Kripke, her relation to Azazel was supposed to be addressed in the third season, but was pushed back to the fourth season due to the 2007-08 writer's strike.

In The Winchesters
In "Pilot", on March 23, 1972, a young Mary meets John Winchester as he returns home from fighting in the Vietnam War. Mary later rescues John from a demon and reluctantly introduces him to the world of the supernatural. Mary's father Samuel has recently gone missing while on a hunting trip and has sent Mary to recover a schematic from an old Men of Letters clubhouse of a mysterious box. Teaming up with John and her friends Carlos Cervantez and Latika Dar, Mary pursues both her missing father and the box. Mary reveals to John that she is consumed with guilt over the recent death of her cousin Maggie and seeks to leave the hunting life as a result. Although the group is unable to find Samuel, they do succeed in locating the box which is able to trap and kill demons. Ada Monroe reveals that Samuel was seeking the box as it is the only thing that can kill the Akrida, a malevolent force not of this world that seeks to invade and destroy all manner of life. While the Men of Letters had stopped them in the past, they are gone now, leaving the Akrida free to invade. Mary decides to continue Samuel's work as well as to continue her search for her father with John, Carlos, Latika and Ada joining her.

Rufus Turner
Rufus Turner, portrayed by Steven Williams, is a semi-retired hunter who helped Bobby Singer when his wife, Karen Singer, was possessed by a demon. Rufus exorcised the demon and helped cover up Karen's death. It is Rufus who introduced Bobby to the world of the supernatural, and they hunted together for many years until a hunt went wrong in Omaha, Nebraska, and someone important to Rufus died. They became estranged after this. Fifteen years later, Rufus responds to Bobby's request for information on Bela Talbot and helps Dean locate her in "Time Is On My Side." He returns to active hunting after Lucifer rises and the Apocalypse begins.

Rufus is introduced in the third-season episode "Time Is on My Side" when Bobby, who has not heard from Rufus in about 15 years, receives a phone call in which Rufus alerts him to the whereabouts of Bela Talbot. Dean visits Rufus, even though Sam opposes the idea of hunting for Bela, as they have only a couple of weeks until Dean's deal runs out. Rufus presents Dean with a manila folder on Bela, which gives Dean new and interesting details from her past.

Rufus appears off-screen in "When the Levee Breaks", when he calls Bobby with news of more of the 66 Seals being broken.

In "Good God Y'All", Rufus heads to a town he thinks is under attack from demons, based on omens of a polluted river and a falling star. He calls Ellen, Jo, and Bobby for help. When Sam and Dean arrive, he and Jo have been separated from Ellen. Jo and Rufus capture Sam, thinking he is possessed. Later, Ellen and Dean help break the spell War has over them. Bobby talks on the phone to Rufus about omens that may indicate the appearance of Death, in "The Devil You Know".

In "Weekend at Bobby's", Rufus arrives at Singer Salvage Yard to dispose of the body of an apparently dead Okami. Bobby assists him and helps him evade capture by the FBI. However, the Okami is revealed to still be alive and is subsequently dispatched by Bobby. Afterward, Rufus uses his contacts to uncover information on Crowley's life as a human and later steals a signet ring from a museum which once belonged to Crowley's son as part of Bobby's attempt to regain his soul from the demon. Rufus investigates the same case as the Winchesters and Bobby, in "...And Then There Were None". The group later encounters Samuel and Gwen Campbell, and discover that the monster is a new breed created by Eve, the "Khan Worm." After Gwen and Samuel are killed, Rufus is stabbed by a possessed Bobby. As cremation is not undertaken in the Jewish tradition, Rufus is buried in a Jewish cemetery rather than given a Hunter's funeral pyre. Bobby pours some of Rufus' favorite drink—Johnnie Walker Blue Label—on the grave before taking a drink himself.

After becoming comatose from being shot in the head by Dick Roman, Bobby relives various memories of Sam, Dean, Karen, his family, and Rufus. Remembering Rufus has a traumatic effect on Bobby, and he reveals to Rufus that he is just a memory appearing in Bobby's comatose mind. While initially disbelieving, Rufus accompanies Bobby in a quest through the past in which Bobby confronts his worst memories to momentarily recover from his gunshot wound.

In "Safe House", flashbacks show a case Bobby and Rufus worked together during the fourth season where Rufus called Bobby for help on an apparent haunted house. However, the two eventually realized they were dealing with a being known as a Soul Eater rather than a ghost. Unable to kill the Soul Eater, Rufus painted a sigil that would trap it, but the Soul Eater pulled Bobby's soul out of his body and into its "nest" outside of time and space, using Bobby to attack Rufus. Rufus subdued the possessed Bobby and finished the sigil, trapping the Soul Eater in its nest. He later leaves Bobby the bottle of Johnny Walker Blue found by Sam and Jody Mills in "Time After Time" since Bobby was right about what they were dealing with and brushes off Bobby's concerns about how he escaped the nest.

Sam Winchester

Samuel Campbell
Samuel Campbell, portrayed by Mitch Pileggi and Tom Welling, is the maternal grandfather of Sam and Dean Winchester, and Sam Winchester's namesake.

In Supernatural
He and his wife Deanna are revealed to be hunters in the fourth-season episode "In the Beginning", where Dean is transported back in time. Dean discovers that Samuel is being possessed by Azazel, and Samuel dies when Azazel leaves his body.

Samuel returns as a recurring character in the sixth season, where in the premiere, it is revealed that Samuel was brought down from Heaven at the same time Sam was resurrected from Hell. While he claims to have no idea why he was brought back, he, Sam and the other surviving members of the Campbell family are shown to be capturing dangerous supernatural creatures behind Dean's back, instead of killing them.

Samuel, who knows the cure to vampirism, returns during a string of vampire attacks in Limestone, Illinois, after Dean has been turned into a vampire. Knowing that Sam knew about the cure, as well, he concludes that Sam wanted Dean inside the nest to locate the Alpha Vampire, though Sam denies it.

It is later revealed that Samuel was resurrected by Crowley, and working with him in an attempt to find the location of Purgatory—the afterlife for monsters—in exchange for his daughter's resurrection. After Samuel betrayed the Winchesters when they attempted to kill Crowley, claiming that Mary was the only family that mattered to him, Dean vows to kill his grandfather the next time they meet.

A case he worked during his year spent hunting with Sam is seen in the episode, "Unforgiven", during which Samuel was shown to be disturbed at soulless-Sam's actions, using one of their current allies as bait to trap a monster.

In "...And Then There Were None", Samuel and Gwen encounter Sam, Dean, Rufus, and Bobby as they all investigate the same case. Sam prevents Dean from killing Samuel, feeling that he may be of some use yet. Samuel learns that Sam has regained his soul and has no memory of their time together. Gwen reveals that she was unaware of Samuel's betrayal but is killed by Dean, who is possessed by the Khan worm. Samuel is unapologetic when confronted by the brothers, though he did seem remorseful on it. It is subsequently revealed that he was possessed by the Khan worm and is shot dead by Sam. However, the Khan worm is not killed and uses his body to attack the group, but is driven out of Samuel when Bobby throws him against a live wire, electrocuting him and revealing the Khan worm's weakness.

In "Stuck In the Middle (With You)", a resurrected Mary reveals to Arthur Ketch that Samuel had used to tell her stories about the Colt. Unlike the legend that John Winchester knew about the gun, Samuel's version had the correct information that there were only five things that it couldn't kill rather than it being able to kill anything.

In "Hey, That's No Way To Say Goodbye," Dean and Bobby find it weird to see the Samuel from the Monster Club's world with a full head of hair, referencing their encounters with this version of Samuel.

In The Winchesters
In "Pilot", in March 1972, Samuel vanishes after opening a secret tomb hidden in a New Orleans cemetery. Before he disappears, Samuel directs Mary to retrieve a schematic from a mysterious box from a Men of Letters clubhouse, but he keeps the true purpose of his actions a secret, alarming her as this is something that Samuel never does. Mary teams up with John Winchester, Carlos Cervantez and Latika Dar to find her missing father and the box. The group uncovers that it is a weapon created by the Men of Letters that can trap and destroy monsters and locate it in the secret tomb that Samuel had opened. However, there is no sign of Samuel himself. Ada Monroe, who had been helping Samuel to search through various Men of Letters properties, reveals that Samuel had learned of the existence of the Akrida, monsters not of this world who want to invade, destroy all manner of life on Earth and take over the world for themselves. With the Men of Letters gone and no longer able to stop them, Samuel has been attempting to stop the Akrida by finding where they cross over into this world and using the box - the only thing that can kill them - to stop them. Mary and her friends decide to both continue the search for Samuel and to finish what he started. In the following episode, they find a number of dead zombies and a spent shell casing with Samuel's initials on it, but both Samuel and the information on the Akrida gone and a lead on a new case for them to follow.

In "Reflections," Samuel has been captured by the Akrida leader that is possessing Rockin' Roxy who offers to trade Samuel for the box, in reality something called the Ostium that can banish the Akrida back to their own world. They agree to make the trade, but use the Ostium to banish the Akrida leader instead after figuring out how to power it up again with the help of the ghost of Henry Winchester. However, this fails to kill all of the Akrida as expected as she was not the Akrida Queen. As several Akrida corner John and Mary, an injured Samuel appears to save them by using the Ostium to banish their attackers before collapsing from his injuries.

In "Hang On to Your Life," an injured Samuel is treated by Millie and explains that he'd found out about the Ostium and the Akrida while looking for a way to get rid of all monsters forever, feeling guilty for pushing his daughter into the hunting life. Samuel joins the Monster Club in fighting Loki and provides them with reconnaissance photos of several potential locations for the queen, although the pictures prove to have been light damaged. After Loki's defeat, Samuel leaves with Ada to search for magic capable of stopping the Akrida while leaving the broken Ostium in Millie's hands so that she can try to repair it, but Samuel promises to keep in touch this time. Amongst Samuel's pictures, John finds the man who gave him Henry's letter in the background of one, revealing him to be Dean Winchester, John's son and Samuel's grandson.

In "Hey, That's No Way To Say Goodbye," Samuel returns after receiving the news that Ada has found magic capable of stopping the Akrida Queen who intends to use a planetary alignment to open her portal and begin the invasion. Samuel is contacted by a former hunter named Joan Hopkins who turns out to be the Akrida Queen, having been driven insane, consumed monster essences and seeks to wipe out humanity as a result. While the others try to summon Dean back from where Joan has banished him to, John, Carlos and Samuel hold off Joan and several Akrida to buy them time, before Mary finally kills Joan by hitting her with the Impala which is capable of hurting her as the car is from another universe. The Akrida are destroyed with Joan's death and Dean explains to Samuel and the gathered hunters that they were a failsafe plan of Chuck's in the event of his defeat which Dean had discovered while traversing the Multiverse following his death. Dean reveals that John, Mary and Samuel are from an alternate universe that he'd come across during his travels while trying to find a world where his family got a chance at a happy ending. After Dean's departure back to Heaven, Samuel says goodbye to Mary and leaves, presumably on another hunting trip, while Mary leaves Lawrence with John to figure out what they want to do with their futures.

Samuel Colt
Based on the historical gun maker of the same name, Samuel Colt is a hunter who lived in the 19th century and the creator of the Colt—a gun that can kill almost any supernatural being; Lucifer revealed that he is one of five supernatural beings immune to its powers. Colt also designed the locked door that keeps the portal to Hell known as the Devil's Gate from opening. The Devil's Gate and the Colt gun are linked together—the gun serves as the key to the gate, allowing it to be opened by inserting the Colt's muzzle into the key hole. Colt also built a railroad of iron, in the shape of a pentagram with a church at each of the points, around the devil's gate to further ensure that it was demon-proof. Colt was portrayed by Sam Hennings in the season six episode "Frontierland". Sam and Dean, when looking for a method of destroying Eve, come across Colt's journal which reveals that the hunter had killed a phoenix in 1861. As the ashes of a phoenix are needed to kill Eve, Castiel sends Sam and Dean back in time to retrieve them. Although Samuel is initially reluctant to assist Sam, he eventually gives him the Colt which Dean kills the phoenix with. When Sam and Dean are pulled back to the present day without the ashes, it is revealed that Colt sent a courier package 150 years ago containing the ashes, which arrives at Bobby's door. He was able to figure out how to use Sam's cell phone, which he left behind (and which Colt sent back to him), and learned the date and Bobby's address from it.

Walt and Roy

Walt and Roy are two hunters first appearing in season 5's "Dark Side of the Moon." Having learned of Sam's role in starting the Apocalypse, the two hunters ambush the Winchesters in a motel room with the intention of killing Sam whom they see as a monster. After Dean recognizes both men, they decided to kill both Winchesters rather than risk Dean's wrath. Dean promises that when he inevitably returns, he will hunt them down and kill them for revenge. The Winchesters are sent to Heaven after the murder and are eventually resurrected by the angel Joshua on the orders of God.

Both Walt and Roy return in season 12's "Who We Are" as two of the hunters called in to help deal with the British Men of Letters situation by Jody Mills. Having not seen the Winchesters since murdering them in "Dark Side of the Moon", the reunion is somewhat awkward, but Dean assures both men that there are no lasting hard feelings over their actions. Walt and Roy join Sam's assault on the British Men of Letters base with Roy even saving Sam's life from a British operative that Sam misses. Roy is killed during the assault by another operative that Sam shoots moments later, but Walt survives. Walt, who acts as the team's explosives expert, joins Sam and Jody in confronting Doctor Hess and follows Sam's lead during the confrontation.

Walt is mentioned again in season 13's "Wayward Sisters" as one of the hunters contacted by Alex Jones when the Winchesters disappear. Like the other hunters, Walt has seen no sign of them but promises to keep looking.

Other humans

Adam Milligan
Adam Milligan, portrayed by Jake Abel is the illegitimate son of John Winchester and the half-brother of Sam and Dean Winchester. He was born from a relationship between John and a woman named Kate Milligan, while John was on a hunt. At age 12, he begged his mother to call his father and from then on they would have sporadic contact, but John never told Adam of his other sons, who had no idea about Adam's existence. Despite John's attempts at parenting, Adam never saw John as his father and viewed his mother as his only family, but still wished to have a closer relationship with his father.

His existence is revealed to Sam and Dean in Jump the Shark, in which he was murdered by ghouls along with his mother, as the ghouls wanted revenge on John for the murder of their father. One of the ghouls took on Adam's identity to lure John to them. However, as John was already dead, his other sons got the call and were shocked to learn of their half-brother. During their investigation, Adam's body was discovered by Dean, just as Sam was attacked by the ghouls, who settled for killing Sam and Dean. Dean killed the ghouls, avenging Adam's death and they subsequently gave a hunter's funeral for the brother they never knew.

In season 5's "Point of No Return", Adam is resurrected by Zachariah to serve as Michael's vessel after Dean's continuing refusal to say yes. However, Castiel senses Adam's resurrection and is able to get to him before the angels do and the Winchesters, Castiel and Bobby continually try to talk Adam out of his plan without any luck as Zachariah has promised to bring back his mother in exchange for Adam's help. Zachariah eventually appears to Adam in the form of a dream and convinces him to reveal where the Winchesters are keeping him. Zachariah takes Adam to the Green Room where he reveals that Adam's resurrection was actually a trap to get Dean to say yes, using Dean's weakness for his family against him. The Winchesters storm the Green Room to Adam's surprise and Zachariah tortures both Sam and Adam to finally get a yes out of Dean. However, at the last minute, Dean changes his mind and kills Zachariah with an angel blade. As the three humans try to flee, the descending Michael traps Adam in the Green Room with himself and Zachariah's body and the room disappears when the Winchesters try to get back inside. Both Sam and Dean acknowledge that neither Adam nor Castiel are likely alright and vow to get them back.

In "Two Minutes to Midnight", Castiel reveals to Sam that Adam has now become Michael's vessel for the rapidly-approaching final battle which Sam admits is a possibility that they didn't really want to consider.

In "Swan Song", Adam is Michael's vessel when he meets with Lucifer in Stull Cemetery for the final battle of the Apocalypse. When Dean arrives, he tries to apologize to Adam, but the archangel tells him that "Adam isn't home right now." After retaking control from Lucifer, Sam throws himself, Lucifer, Michael and Adam into Lucifer's Cage to stop the Apocalypse.

In season 6's "Appointment in Samarra", Dean is offered the choice of saving Adam or Sam from Hell by Death and he chooses Sam though he does ask Death to save Adam too without success.

In season 10's "Fan Fiction", the Winchesters are confused when, during a play based on the Supernatural books, a character they don't recognize comes on stage. Maeve tells them that it is Adam who is still stuck in Hell with Lucifer. Sam and Dean's reactions suggest that they have forgotten about Adam.

In season 15's "Our Father, Who Aren't In Heaven", Adam, still Michael's vessel, has escaped from Hell after God threw every door in Hell open, including the door to Lucifer's Cage. Now sharing control of his body with the archangel, Adam enjoys eating a variety of food for the first time in ten years and discusses with Michael, appearing as a duplicate of Adam himself, what they will both do now. The two have bonded during their time in the cage and Adam indirectly suggests that they stay together, which Michael does not seem opposed to. Adam's meal is interrupted by the arrival of Lilith seeking Michael on God's orders, ending with Michael killing the demon. Michael later returns control to Adam after he is captured by the Winchesters and Adam explains that he and Michael reached an agreement during their years in the Cage when they only had each other for company. To Michael's surprise, Adam sides with his brothers on the matter, pointing out that while he doesn't forgive them, he knows Sam and Dean always try to do the right thing. Adam eventually gets Michael to admit that he refuses to doubt God as he feels that is a betrayal of who he is. Michael isn't convinced to help until Castiel shows Michael his own memories of God's betrayals. As Michael prepares to leave, he returns control to Adam at Dean's request. Dean apologizes to his brother for what happened to him, stating that Adam is a good man and didn't deserve what happened to him. Adam quips "since when do we get what we deserve?" and wishes them luck before departing with Michael.

In "Inherit the Earth", Michael sadly reveals that Adam was killed along with the rest of humanity by Chuck, although the archangel continues to use Adam's body as his vessel. Chuck subsequently obliterates Michael for his betrayal, taking with him Adam's body. However, Jack restores everyone Chuck killed, meaning that Adam is restored as well.

Amelia Richardson
Amelia Richardson, portrayed by Liane Balaban, is a veterinarian living in Kermit, Texas. Her father is Stan Thompson. Amelia was married to a man named Don Richardson, who was thought to have been killed while serving in Afghanistan. She and Sam Winchester meet when he hits a dog and brings it into her place of work. They begin a relationship and share a house for some months in Kermit before she discovers that her husband is still alive. Sam leaves to allow her to reconnect with her husband.

Amelia reappears in a flashback in season 11's "The Devil in the Details." While going through Sam's memories, Lucifer shows Sam a memory of the two of them together. Lucifer tells Sam that Sam abandoning Dean for a normal life with Amelia is the worst thing that Sam has ever done and that Sam is still plagued by guilt over it. As a result of that guilt, Sam is no longer willing to lose Dean no matter the consequences the world could face as a result. Sam continues to be plagued by guilt over this in "Into the Mystic" due to Lucifer's words, but Dean tells Sam that he has long since forgiven him for his actions.

Arthur Ketch
Arthur Ketch, portrayed by David Haydn-Jones, is a former British Man of Letters. Ketch is first mentioned while Lady Toni Bevell is torturing Sam for information. When all their methods prove fruitless, Ms. Watt suggests bringing in Ketch; however, Toni is vehemently against it. He's also shown in a flashback killing a vampire, identifiable by the tattoo on his hand. Later on, Mick Davies retrieves Toni and informs her that he has sent for Ketch, who is shown preparing to leave the UK. This leaves Toni visibly uncomfortable.

In "Season 12, American Nightmare", Ketch drives up to the Impala on a motorcycle and stares at it or a moment before driving away. He later tracks down and kills Magda Peterson, telling someone on the phone that he cleaned up the Winchesters mess and they were right about the Winchesters being unable to kill her.

In "LOTUS", Ketch rescues the Winchesters and Castiel from the Secret Service and orders Castiel to wipe their memory before introducing himself. That night, Arthur explains that his job is to "strongly encourage" the Winchesters cooperation with the British Men of Letters and was sent by Mick Davies after Sam called him and hung up. Ketch has Castiel confirm that he's not lying and shows them his arsenal of weapons, including a hyperbolic pulse generator capable of exorcising a demon from its vessel. Recognizing its potential, Sam asks to borrow it and for Ketch to trust them. Ketch eventually gives the Winchesters the generator, enabling them to force Lucifer from President Jefferson Rooney and send Lucifer back to his Cage.

Six weeks later, Castiel contacts Arthur Ketch and Mick to help him and Mary find Sam and Dean who have been taken prisoner by the Secret Service. The two men are impressed to learn that the brothers had in fact borrowed Arthur's gadget to deal with Lucifer himself. They agree to help in hopes that it will earn them the trust of the American hunters, and through their connections, Arthur and Mick locate Sam and Dean near Site 94.

Once the four encounter Sam and Dean, Arthur is unimpressed to learn that they left survivors. Sam insists the people pursuing them were just soldiers doing their job, though Arthur considers it "unprofessional". Sam, Dean and Castiel head to Mary's car while glaring at Arthur suspiciously. Arthur and Mick watch them drive off and share a knowing look at each other. It is later revealed that Arthur went back and killed all those involved in Sam and Dean's imprisonment, including Agent Rick, Agent Camp, the soldiers and the coroner. Mick reports this while noting that cleaning up loose ends is Arthur's job.

In "Stuck in the Middle (With You)", Mary visits Arthur after stealing the Colt and tells him the story of its theft from Ramiel. Mary is enraged that Arthur sent her after a Prince of Hell which got Wally killed and threatens to destroy the British Men of Letters if something happens to her sons. Arthur apologizes, claiming not to have known that she was going after a Prince of Hell. Arthur and Mary discuss the legend of the Colt as an excited Arthur unwraps it.

In "The Raid", Mary and Arthur take out a vampire nest together and Arthur expresses his dislike for them trying to recruit the Winchester brothers when they have Mary. Arthur later visits Dean at the Men of Letters bunker and sits down for a drink with him. Rather than trying the sales pitch of the other British Men of Letters, Arthur is frank with Dean about his motives, telling Dean that he is a killer and the British Men of Letters offer him the best chance to express his talents. Arthur sees Dean as the same as him and the two decide to take down a vampire nest together. At the nest, Arthur initially arms himself with a gun, but decides to use a machete instead like Dean. The two men find only one vampire hiding in the nest and Arthur beats upon her before Dean stops him to try things his way. When Dean promises to grant the vampire a quick end, she tells them that her nest is going after the British Men of Letters.

Alarmed, Dean and Arthur rush back to the British Men of Letters compound to find that Sam has killed the Alpha Vampire and the surviving vampires have fled. Mick berates Arthur who tells him he was trying to recruit Dean and would have succeeded if Mick's operation hadn't screwed things up. He then takes the rogue hunter Pierce Moncrieff for punishment.

In season 13, a resurrected Arthur returns as a mercenary hunter separated from the British Men of Letters who are unaware of his survival. In "War of the Worlds", he is going by the alias of Alexander Ketch, pretending to be Arthur's twin brother. However, Dean sees through the disguise and Arthur explains that he had made a deal with Rowena for a resurrection spell that he needs recharged which brought him back after Mary killed him. Arthur saves the Winchesters from a group of demons and insists that he is on their side and that his previous actions only came from being a soldier on the opposite side of a war from them. When Dean tries to kill Arthur again, he flees and is later seen being employed by the Prince of Hell Asmodeus who is preparing to procure Jack for the Alternate Michael's invasion.

In "Devil's Bargain", Asmodeus supplies Arthur with an angel blade and sends him to kill the weakened Lucifer, believing Lucifer to be vulnerable to an angel blade in his current state. Arthur once again encounters the Winchesters who have Castiel knock him unconscious and lock him in the Impala's trunk, intending to kill him and scatter his ashes to make his death permanent. Arthur once more escapes confinement, just in time to use a demon bomb to drive Lucifer and Anael away, saving the Winchesters and Castiel. Stating that Lucifer being loose upon the Earth is a line too far for him, Arthur reveals his alliance with Asmodeus and offers to work with the Winchesters as a double agent to stop Lucifer, Asmodeus and the threat of an alternate reality Michael. Recognizing that they need him, the Winchesters reluctantly agree to the alliance. Upon Arthur's return to Asmodeus' lair, Asmodeus reveals that he has acquired the Archangel Blade, the one weapon that can kill an archangel such as Lucifer or Michael. After Arthur points out that the blade can only be used to kill an archangel by another archangel, Asmodeus introduces him to the captive archangel Gabriel who has been believed dead for nearly eight years.

In "The Thing", Arthur discovers that Asmodeus has been injecting himself with Gabriel's grace to power up. Arthur's continuing impertinence and defiance enrage Asmodeus who brutally beats him. Asmodeus states that Arthur is more wicked than any demon he knows "and I know 'em all", but recognizes that Arthur seeks redemption for his past actions which he doesn't think that Arthur can get. Once Asmodeus leaves him alone, Arthur gets back at him by rescuing Gabriel and steals Asmodeus' store of Gabriel's extracted grace as well as the Archangel Blade. Arthur brings all three to the Winchesters, seeking sanctuary from Asmodeus in return which Dean agrees to. After the Winchesters open a rift to Apocalypse World, Arthur decides to join Dean on the mission, feeling that he is safer in another universe when Asmodeus will inevitably come looking for him.

In "Bring 'Em Back Alive", Arthur teams up with a reluctant Dean to find and rescue Mary and Jack. The two witness several angels executing resistance fighters and taking captive Charlie Bradbury, the alternate counterpart of an old friend of Dean's. Against Arthur's wishes, Dean sets out to rescue Charlie, the two men being forced to work together to survive. Along the way, Dean tells Arthur of his inability to save Charlie and Arthur admits his own regrets that he never even tried to save the lives of those he cares about. Together, Dean and Arthur raid a POW camp, killing several angels and liberating Charlie and several other human prisoners. With the rift closing, Arthur chooses to remain behind in Apocalypse World with Charlie to continue the mission to find Mary and Jack and to help coordinate for Dean's inevitable return with reinforcements. As angels attack the rift, Arthur engages in battle with them alongside Charlie.

In "Exodus", Arthur has become a full-fledged member of the Apocalypse World resistance and joins Charlie on a mission to ambush an angel death squad. However, it turns out to be a trap and both are captured. Arthur undergoes extensive torture for information on the resistance, but refuses to break, even taunting his captors. The angels call in an alternate reality Castiel to tear the information from Charlie's mind, but Sam, Dean, Mary, Jack and Castiel arrive to rescue them, killing all of the angels, including the alternate Castiel. As Dean helps him, Arthur comments on the irony of Dean saving his life for once. Arthur joins the later exodus through the rift and is one of the first through. In the bunker, he and Rowena express shock at the sight of each other before Arthur moves on. During the later party, Arthur enjoys a drink with Charlie. He is mentioned to be off doing his own thing in "Let the Good Times Roll".

In season 14's "Stranger in a Strange Land", Arthur is mentioned to be following up on a lead in London in the search for a way to save Dean from Michael's possession. Sam later gets a call from Arthur and tells Castiel that Arthur has been searching for the hyperbolic pulse generator, the device they used to exorcise Lucifer out of the President in the hopes that it can be used to eject Michael from Dean. However, Arthur has had no luck in his search. In "The Spear", Arthur has found the hyperbolic pulse generator, but is forced to mail it to the Winchesters who are less than pleased as they need it immediately. Somewhat stunned, Arthur apologizes for his inability to deliver it to them directly. Though the Winchesters find the package, the device is destroyed by Michael before they can use it. In "Jack in the Box", Arthur is unable to attend Mary's hunter's memorial. Instead, he sends a bottle of the same expensive scotch he'd brought Dean in "The Raid."

In season 15's "Raising Hell", Arthur arrives in Harlan, Kansas after God releases all of the souls in Hell upon the world. After meeting the demon Belphegor, Arthur reveals that he was hired to assassinate Belphegor by the demon Ardat who claims that Belphegor is "a monstrous threat to humanity." As this doesn't seem to be the case, Arthur refrains from harming the demon and assists the Winchesters and Rowena in finding a way to contain the souls, developing a mutual attraction with Rowena in the process. Arthur is later possessed by the ghost of Francis Tumblety, forcing Dean to shoot him with iron bullets to expel Francis. With Castiel unable to heal Arthur, he is taken to the hospital for treatment and takes Dean shooting him good-naturedly.

In "The Rupture", after awakening in the hospital, Arthur prepares to leave to help his friends, only to have Ardat arrive. Unable to defeat the demon, Arthur refuses to give up his friends for any price, something that Ardat recognizes. Ardat rips out Arthur's heart and after showing it to him for a minute, crushes Arthur's heart, killing him. Ardat later poses as Arthur using his phone to trick Dean into revealing where the Winchesters are and what they are up to. His death is subsequently avenged when Belphegor kills Ardat, but not before she reveals to Castiel that Belphegor truly is the threat she'd claimed to Arthur when she hired him to kill Belphegor. At the end of the episode, Dean reveals to Sam that the other hunters found Arthur and that he was probably killed by a demon. Having just lost Rowena as well, both Sam and Dean are devastated by the news.

Ash
Ash, portrayed by Chad Lindberg, is a mullet-wearing computer expert, who works and lives at Harvelle's Roadhouse with Jo and Ellen Harvelle. He attended MIT, but was kicked out for "fighting". He owns a homemade laptop, which he uses to track the paranormal, particularly Azazel, with the information John Winchester and his sons, Sam and Dean, have gathered. In the episode "All Hell Breaks Loose: Part 1", he calls Dean to tell him he has discovered something important, but by the time Dean arrives at the Roadhouse to talk, the Roadhouse has been burned to the ground, and Dean finds Ash's corpse in the rubble.

Series creator Eric Kripke stated that Ash's death "had to do with how much I hated the actual Roadhouse itself rather than anyone in it." As for the character's return, Kripke replied, "Ash is a possibility." This comes to fruition in the fifth-season episode "Dark Side of the Moon", in which Sam and Dean meet Ash in Heaven, as well as Pamela. Enjoying the afterlife more than his actual life, and having discovered means to infiltrate other people's Heavens and tap into the angel's communications, Ash helps the brothers hide from Zachariah. Ash also revealed to them that they have died more times than they know and he has helped them before, with the angels erasing their memories upon resurrection.

Ava Wilson
Ava Wilson, portrayed by Katharine Isabelle is one of Azazel's "Special Children". After being kidnapped from her home and forced fight to the death with other Special Children in Cold Oaks, she eventually becomes skilled in her power to control demons. She is ultimately killed by Jake Talley.

Becky Rosen
Becky Rosen, portrayed by Emily Perkins, is a fan of the "Supernatural" series of books. Her online name is samlicker81, and she is the webmistress of morethanbrothers.net. She writes Wincest fanfiction. Carver Edlund aka Chuck Shurley contacts her to get a message to Sam and Dean in "Sympathy for the Devil". She initially believed it to be a joke but Chuck told her that his stories were real and she was excited as she thought so. It is obvious from her reaction to the boys that she is a Sam Girl, and fixates upon him much to his dismay.

Becky Rosen "borrows" Chuck Shurley's phone, pretending to be him, and texts Sam & Dean saying he's in a life or death situation in "The Real Ghostbusters". Sam and Dean rush over after driving all night only to find out that Becky has invited them to a Supernatural Convention for Chuck's books. When real ghosts start attacking people, Chuck has to step up and help keep everyone safe while Sam and Dean and two Supernatural fanboys, Demian and Barnes, fight the ghosts. His bravery impresses Becky who immediately abandons her pursuit of Sam for a relationship with Chuck. She also tells Sam that in the book which covers the events of "Time Is on My Side", Bela gave the Colt not to Lilith but to her right hand demon, and possibly lover, Crowley.

In "Season 7, Time for a Wedding!" a Crossroads Demon named Guy gives her a love potion to make Sam marry her, she believed Guy was a Wiccan until the demon betrays her and shows her his eyes. Guy asks for her soul in exchange for making the effect permanent, he wanted to make a deal after seeing she was married to the skilled hunter even agreeing with her about Sam easily killing. Sam warned her not to go through with the deal. According to her, Chuck broke up with her, which is presumably her reason for fixating on Sam again. During the battle at the end, she helps trap the demon, but his minion breaks him free. As the demon and his minion Jackson are about to kill the hunters, Becky retrieves Ruby's Knife and kills Jackson with it, allowing the Winchesters to overpower the Crossroads Demon whose deals are revoked by Crowley who is bemused when she excitedly recognizes him. Later, she and Sam get an annulment.

In "Slumber Party", it is revealed by Charlie that Becky posted all of Chuck's unpublished manuscripts to the Internet, with the result that the public is now 'aware' of events in Sam and Dean's lives up to the confrontation between Lucifer/Sam and Michael/Adam. When asked if they know her, Sam quickly denies it.

In "Atomic Monsters", Chuck visits Becky for help though she is less than pleased to see him. Though still a fan of Supernatural, Becky is not quite so obsessed anymore and has married and had children. Becky agrees to edit Chuck's newest story and provides critique that essentially acts as meta references for both the episode and the show itself. Becky's words causes Chuck to write a much darker ending, much to Becky's horror. When her family comes home, Chuck causes them to vanish with just a snap of his fingers, though Chuck claims that he has simply sent them "away." Revealing his true identity as God himself to Becky, Chuck causes her to vanish into thin air also with a snap of his fingers.

Bela Talbot

Ben Braeden
Ben Braeden is the son of Lisa Braeden, a woman Dean once spent a weekend with in August 1999, portrayed by Nicholas Elia. Lisa and Ben live in Cicero, Indiana. Though Dean suspects he is Ben's biological father, Lisa claims that this is not so.

Dean drops in to visit Lisa in "The Kids Are Alright", while investigating a case, on what happens to be Ben's 8th birthday. Dean meets Ben and is struck by his familiar rock-music loving, girl ogling ways, but Lisa assures Dean that he is not Ben's father. Later Dean helps Ben out in an encounter with some bullies. Although his advice, to "kick the kid in the nuts", does not get Lisa's approval, Ben hugs Dean in thanks. Later Ben is one of the children taken by a mother Changeling, and one of her offspring imitates Ben and starts feeding on Lisa. Dean and Sam rescue all the children and kill the head Changeling, destroying the imitation Ben. Dean is impressed by Ben's cool headed behavior during the rescue, having put Ben in charge of helping the other children out a window.

When Dean returns to Lisa after the showdown in Stull Cemetery, in "Swan Song", Ben is seen at the dinner table.

Dean lives with Lisa and Ben for a year, but after an attack he insists they move and is conflicted by his desire to remain with his new family, his desire to hunt and the fear that he is raising Ben as his father raised him. Eventually, Lisa lets him go in "Two and a Half Men". Dean talks to Ben on the phone in "The Third Man". After believing he is about to die after having been turned into a vampire in "Live Free or Twi-Hard", Dean returns to say goodbye. However, he struggles to control his vampiric urges and shoves Ben and flees. Ben tricks Dean into returning once more in "Mannequin 3: The Reckoning"; however, he fails to reconcile with Lisa and Dean explains to Ben that he fears that if he stayed around, Ben would end up like him. Ben is still upset and accuses Dean of abandoning his family. Ben and Lisa are kidnapped by the demon Crowley, in "Let It Bleed", in an attempt to force Dean to stand down. After they are rescued, Dean asks Castiel to wipe Ben and his mother's memories of him, which he does.

Cole Trenton
Cole Trenton, portrayed by Travis Aaron Wade, is a military brat and an ex-Marine whose father, Edward, was killed by Dean Winchester in 2003, making him bent for revenge against his father's killer all his life. During his time in the military, he took part in the campaigns in Iraq, Darfur, and DR Congo and established many connections, including his longtime friend Kit Verson and a member of the Military Intelligence. Though Cole is not a hunter and leads an ordinary life with a wife and a son, he is an expert at martial arts and is fit due to his time as a soldier, and he also keeps a rifle that is associated with hunters. He tracks Dean upon the latter's sighted attack at a store captured by a surveillance camera and beats Sam, attempting to use him as a hostage. When Sam escapes, Cole follows him as the latter is about to meet Dean at a bar. However, though he finally confronts his father's killer, Dean easily defeats him with his demonic powers, but spares him as he wants Cole to live in humiliation for failing to avenge his father. Cole does not give up, however, and he begins studying about demons and starts to torture demons in hopes of tracking Dean once more. Cole holds Dean at gunpoint when the latter is cornering Rowena, forcing Dean to let her go, and sprays holy water against him, but as Dean is no longer a demon at that point, it does not work. He is defeated once again, but Dean offers to explain his motive of why he killed Edward: Edward was a monster who had killed many people and eaten their livers, and he would have killed Cole and his mother had Dean not killed him earlier. Convinced by Dean and Sam, Cole decides to drop his revenge and return to his family.

Later, Cole with Dean and Sam work together to help his friend, Kit, after the latter's wife, Jemma, reported his weird actions. Upon finding out that Kit is possessed by a Khan Worm, Cole is concerned that the Winchesters would try to kill him like they did with countless others, including his father. Cole is possessed by a Khan Worm, but Dean manages to save him by dehydrating the room and causing the monster to flee. However, the three are too late to stop Kit from succumbing to the parasite even further, and Sam has to kill him because of it. Cole thanks the brothers for saving him, but hopes that he will never see them again.

Ed Zeddmore and Harry Spangler

Ed Zeddmore and Harry Spangler, portrayed by A.J. Buckley and Travis Wester, are self-proclaimed professional paranormal investigators. They are introduced in the episode "Hell House" written by Trey Callaway as the Hell Hounds, operating a website called HellHoundsLair.com. They perceive Sam and Dean as amateurs, although the latter use the duo and their website to help them defeat the monster of the week. At the end of the episode Sam pulls a prank on them by posing as a Hollywood producer on the phone. In the episode "Ghostfacers", they produce a television pilot, which covers their investigation of a house that is haunted every leap day, where Sam and Dean make a guest appearance; however, Sam and Dean manage to magnetically wipe their footage. The episode was nominated for a GLAAD award for its portrayal of Ghostfacers intern Alan Corbett. In "It's a Terrible Life", where the Winchesters are placed in an alternative life as office workers, Zeddmore and Spangler appear on the Ghostfacers website where they present instructional videos on how to find and to defeat ghosts, and refer to the Winchesters as rival "douchebags that we hate". Ed, Harry and the rest of the team also star in the Ghostfacers web series, a spoof advertisement which is seen in "Hammer of the Gods". They were also used as plot devices, in the season nine episode "Thinman" Ed and Harry face a conflict similar to one Sam and Dean face, creating a parallel between the characters, at the end of that episode we see an end to the Ghostfacers after Ed invents the monster Thinman to keep Harry from leaving for a normal life. Their names are homage to Winston Zeddemore and Egon Spengler, members of the Ghostbusters from the 1984 film.

Eldon Styne
Eldon Styne, portrayed by David Hoflin, is the heir to the powerful Styne Family, a dynasty of people who cause and take advantage of disasters including the Nazi rise to power and the September 11th attacks to make a profit. Like all other members of his family, Eldon has received surgical enhancements including a second heart and more muscles in his legs, making him physically powerful and hard to stop. After his brother Jacob is killed, Eldon is dispatched to hunt down the Winchesters and the Book of the Damned. After being captured by Dean, Eldon tells him the family history, including that they used to be known as the Frankensteins and that the Book can't be destroyed. After Dean leaves to confront Sam over the revelation, Eldon escapes by ripping off his own arm. After hearing from his cousin Eli that he has found Charlie Bradbury, Eldon goes after her personally in hopes she has the Book. After finding her, Eldon brutally murders her but is left empty-handed. Returning home, Eldon tells his father of the Men of Letters bunker and its stash of supernatural knowledge and suggests they raid it. Eldon gets a new arm from a boy that had been bullying his little brother Cyrus and takes him and his cousin Roscoe to rob the bunker. As he prepares to burn what they can't take, Dean arrives, killing Roscoe and he and Eldon face off. Eldon taunts Dean over Charlie's murder until the latter reveals he slaughtered Eldon's whole family in revenge. Dean then points out that despite all the enhancements Eldon has, he still only has one brain. Not getting it, Eldon asks him "so what" before Dean shoots him in the head, killing him.

Frank Devereaux
Frank Devereaux, portrayed by Kevin McNally, is an expert in counterfeit documents and in avoiding government intelligence. He was first introduced in the sixth episode of the seventh season, "Slash Fiction". It is revealed in the eleventh episode, "Adventures In Babysitting", that when he was 26, his wife and two children were killed. Sometime after that, he met Bobby Singer, who once saved his life in Port Huron. Frank lives in a run-down, electronics filled house on a little traveled street. He describes himself as 'bi-polar with delusional ideation'.

Bobby sends the Winchesters to see Frank when two Leviathans begin a series of killings throughout the country, masquerading as the brothers. When Sam and Dean enter Frank's house, he is waiting in the dark with a shotgun. He is prepared to shoot them, but because he owes Bobby he agrees to help them. At first, Frank believes that Leviathan Sam and Leviathan Dean are clones created by the government. Frank advises the boys to go into hiding, maybe even move to Cuba, but Dean says they need to go "further off the grid, but keep us on the board" so they can hunt down the Leviathans. He tells them that they need to keep a lower profile, avoid security cameras, and to get rid of their rockstar aliases, which are too easy to track. He smashes Sam's laptop, gives him a new one, and demands $5000 for it. He then takes their pictures for new IDs as Tom and John Smith and gives them a map of the towns their Leviathan doppelgängers have hit so far.

In "Adventures in Babysitting", Dean gives Frank the numbers "45489" which Bobby writes on Sam's hand before he dies, and also asks him to research Dick Roman. Having not heard from him over a month, Dean returns to Frank's house to find it deserted. Frank suddenly appears, confronts Dean, and they both have to shed some blood to prove to the other they are not a Leviathan. Frank states that he has moved all his equipment into an R.V., feeling he was being watched after he started investigating Dick Roman. Frank seems paranoid about Leviathans, even thinking that Gwyneth Paltrow is one of them. He tells Dean he has found nothing on Bobby's numbers, but when he tries combinations adding a sixth number, he discovers that they are coordinates to a field in Wisconsin, owned by Dick Roman. Frank and Dean travel to the area and disguise themselves as phone company workers. They discover surveillance covering the area and retreat to Frank's RV to monitor it. They discover Amanda Willer, an employee of Dick Roman, surveying the site for construction. As they began to spy the camp field, Frank challenges Dean about how he is dealing with himself on the whole situation, even telling Dean his dark past.

In the next episodes, Dean talks with Frank off-screen. In "Out with the Old", Frank talks with Dean by phone from his camper, updating Dean on the Leviathan activity worldwide. He has no record of their activity in Portland, Oregon, where Sam and Dean are currently working, but Leviathans are there all the same. Frank discovers this when Dean asks him to investigates a company behind an odd Realtor; and the company links back to Dick Roman. Sam and Dean set out to meet Frank at the end of the episode, but instead find his RV, filled with smashed electronics and blood. In "The Girl with the Dungeons and Dragons Tattoo", it is revealed that Dick Roman took Frank's hard drive, which he gives to the IT expert Charlie to hack. When Charlie tries to hack it, the defense system uses Frank's voice. After finally hacking it, an automatic email sent to the brothers which states that if they are receiving it, it means that Frank is dead or worse. Frank has a GPS tracker on the drive and it hacks into Charlie's webcam so they know who's hacking it. While Charlie is successful, she finds out the truth about Dick Roman and the Leviathans from his files and later teams up with the Winchesters to erase the drive. Frank's final fate is still unknown.

Jessica Moore
Jessica Lee Moore, portrayed by Adrianne Palicki, is Sam's girlfriend for two years as of the start of the series. Despite this, she is unaware of his family's strange occupation. Sam planned to ask her to marry him, but she is killed by a demon on Azazel's orders; it was revealed the demon that killed her was the friend who introduced her to Sam, named Brady, to break Sam from his increasingly normal life. Her death then prompts Sam to join Dean on his quest to find their missing father and avenge her. In the days preceding her murder, Sam had had premonitions of her murder in dreams, but he ignored them as random nightmares. Afterwards, he feels guilt for dismissing them so easily. Sam eventually kills the demon that killed her and gets revenge. In an alternate timeline created by the disappearance of John Winchester in 2003, Sam mentions that he has no time for a family, suggesting that things didn't work out with Jess in that world.

Kaia Nieves
Kaia Nieves, portrayed by Yadira Guevara-Prip, is a dreamwalker, a human with the ability to view alternate realities in their dreams. In Kaia's case, she is stated to be the most powerful dreamwalker her friend and mentor Derek Swan ever saw. Unlike most dreamwalkers, Kaia has no control over this power and only sees a monster-filled world that she dubs The Bad Place. As is later revealed, this is because of a life-long connection to her alternate reality counterpart Dark Kaia who has in turn seen Kaia's world through their connection.

In season 13's "The Bad Place", Kaia is sought out for help by the Nephilim Jack on the suggestion of Derek Swan as Jack needs a dreamwalker to open a rift to the Apocalypse World alternate reality and rescue Mary Winchester. Jack breaks Kaia out of a drug treatment facility, but she refuses to help and runs off before being kidnapped by angels who are after Jack. Upon being rescued by the Winchesters, Kaia has to be forced at gunpoint to join them and explains that she won't help because of her fears of The Bad Place. After Jack shows Kaia Apocalypse World, she agrees to help. Cornered on an abandoned ship by angels, Kaia suggests opening the rift to escape. Combining his powers with Kaia's, Jack guides her into finding Apocalypse World instead of The Bad Place, but she begins flashing between the two worlds, ending with a vision of Dark Kaia. Jack and Kaia's efforts open a rift, destroying the attacking angels in the process, but sends the Winchesters to The Bad Place, Jack to Apocalypse World and an unconscious Kaia to a nearby roadside.

In "Wayward Sisters", Kaia is found by a passing motorist and transported to Sioux Falls General Hospital for treatment. Claire Novak, aware that the Winchesters were looking for Kaia, locates her in the hospital for help with finding her missing friends, but Kaia flees once again. However, she is attacked by a creature from The Bad Place outside and saved by Claire and Jody. Bonding with Claire over their experiences, Kaia reveals her knowledge of the creature and about the Winchesters' efforts to open a rift. The group realizes that the rift must still be open for the creature to be in their world and with Kaia's help, locates the abandoned ship where more of the creatures reside. With the rift closing, Claire chooses to crossover to The Bad Place to rescue Sam and Dean while the others stay behind to fight off the creatures. Despite her fears, Kaia crosses the rift with Claire and the two rescue Sam and Dean. As they lead the Winchesters to safety, the four are ambushed by Dark Kaia who throws her spear at Claire. Kaia saves Claire's life, but is hit with the spear in the process and apparently dies moments later. With the rift closing and a giant creature closing in on them, the Winchesters and Claire are forced to flee to their world, leaving Kaia's body behind in The Bad Place. Grief-stricken, Claire vows revenge upon Kaia's killer even if she has to find a way back to The Bad Place, unaware that Dark Kaia opened a rift of her own and crossed to their world.

In season 14's "The Scar", the Winchesters and Jody Mills hunt Kaia's killer in their world and are shocked to learn that she is Kaia's alternate counterpart. Dark Kaia admits that Kaia's death was an accident as she was aiming for Claire and displays knowledge of Kaia's interactions with the Winchesters, Dean in particular, from having seen through Kaia's eyes due to their connection. After Dark Kaia escapes again, Jody is left worried about how to explain the situation to Claire who was in love with Kaia and still seeks revenge upon her killer.

In season 15's "Galaxy Brain", Dark Kaia reveals that The Bad Place is dying and that Kaia is in fact still alive and trapped there. In a flashback, Dark Kaia is depicted treating Kaia's wound which had apparently caused her to pass out rather than die as was originally believed, before Dark Kaia abandoned her to cross to their world. With Dark Kaia having left Kaia the tools that she needed, Kaia survived two years stuck in The Bad Place, but Dark Kaia learned that her world is in trouble from the connection that still existed between the two. With the help of Jack and a Reaper named Merle, the Winchesters open another rift to The Bad Place and locate Kaia who has been living in Dark Kaia's old home. As The Bad Place is destroyed, Dark Kaia chooses to remain and die with her world as the Winchesters and Kaia escape through the rift. Reunited with Jody, Kaia accepts an invitation to return to Sioux Falls with her and is pleased to learn that Claire, out seeking Dark Kaia at the time, will be home soon.

Dark Kaia
Dark Kaia, also portrayed by Yadira Guevara-Prip, is the alternate reality counterpart of Kaia from The Bad Place. A dreamwalker like Kaia, Dark Kaia has shared a connection with Kaia for her whole life that has allowed them to see through each other's eyes, though Dark Kaia seems to be more aware of the nature of their connection than Kaia. Due to living in a monster-filled world, Dark Kaia is a tougher more ruthless individual who is implied to have fed others to a giant monster. She also possesses a powerful spear of unknown origin that can hurt and possibly kill an archangel.

In season 13's "The Bad Place", Dark Kaia is briefly seen as a dark hooded figure when Kaia and Jack attempt to open a rift to Apocalypse World to rescue Mary Winchester. Kaia's dreamwalking visions flash between the two alternate worlds before settling on an image of Dark Kaia that appears to be staring right at Kaia. The disruption causes Jack to be sent to Apocalypse World, the Winchesters to The Bad Place and Kaia to a roadside in her world.

In "Wayward Sisters", the Winchesters are stalked and captured by Dark Kaia who refuses to respond to their questions and attempts to feed them to the giant monster. However, Kaia and Claire Novak arrive through the rift and rescue the Winchesters. As they attempt to leave, Dark Kaia tries to kill Claire with her spear, but Kaia shoves Claire out of the way and takes the hit herself, apparently dying in the process. As the Winchesters and Claire turn on Dark Kaia, the giant creature appears which, combined with the closing rift, forces them to flee back to their world. Claire subsequently vows revenge upon Dark Kaia even if she has to find a way back to The Bad Place to get it. Unknown to Claire, another rift opens that night from which Dark Kaia emerges.

In season 14's "The Scar", the Winchesters and Jody hunt down Dark Kaia where she been living in the woods near Sioux Falls after Dean remembers that it was Dark Kaia who injured the alternate reality Michael while he was still possessing Dean. Having killed some of Michael's enhanced vampires that were hunting her, Dark Kaia is captured by the group who are shocked by her resemblance to their fallen friend. Dark Kaia refuses to cooperate, but their confrontation causes Dean to remember Michael attempting to forge an alliance with Dark Kaia that she rejected and fought back as a result of. With more enhanced vampires attacking, Dean frees Dark Kaia who flees. However, she returns with her spear and saves the Winchesters and Jody. Dark Kaia claims that she did it to help herself, not them and decides to hang onto the spear despite the fact that Michael's monsters will continue hunting her for it. The Winchesters subsequently hunt for Dark Kaia and her spear which is the only known weapon that can harm Michael.

In "The Spear", Garth, having infiltrated Michael's organization, overhears Dark Kaia's location and passes it onto the Winchesters. Dean and Castiel track her down and Dean convinces her to lend him the spear. In return, Dark Kaia requests that Jack help her return home where she has somebody that she wants to protect, the magic that allowed her to open the rift on that side not working in their world. Dean accepts, promising to find Dark Kaia when they are done. However, Michael destroys the spear after repossessing Dean.

In season 15's "Galaxy Brain", Dark Kaia kills a cow to draw Jody out and kidnaps her to force Sam and Dean back to Sioux Falls. Dark Kaia demands the return of her spear and that they keep their promise to send her home, but they inform her that the spear has been destroyed and overpower Dark Kaia. Dark Kaia insists on returning home and reveals that The Bad Place is dying and she regrets ever leaving it. Furthermore, their Kaia is still alive, Dark Kaia having treated her wound and left her the tools to survive before leaving her homeworld. Through the connection that still exists between them, Dark Kaia has learned of her world's peril and is frustrated when the Winchesters refuse to use Jack's powers to open the rift as it risks drawing God's attention. Dark Kaia explains that she had envied her counterpart's world and how peaceful it seemed, but found herself unable to fit in or enjoy it and instead lived in hiding. After seeing Kaia's situation through Dark Kaia's mind, Jack agrees to help and gets a Reaper named Merle to help him hide his use of powers so that he can open the rift. Dark Kaia leads the Winchesters back to her old home in The Bad Place where they are reunited with Kaia who has been living there. With The Bad Place on the verge of destruction, Dark Kaia refuses to leave with them and decides to die along with her homeworld, tearfully ordering them to go. Turning to face an approaching massive cloud of destruction, Dark Kaia closes her eyes and extends her arms as she is engulfed by the destruction.

Kelly Kline
Kelly Kline, portrayed by Courtney Ford, is the mother of Jack Kline. She was an aide to and lover of President Jefferson Rooney after the death of his wife. She first appears in "LOTUS", when Lucifer possesses the President and has sex with her, impregnating her. Crowley, realizing that a powerful nephilim has been conceived, teleports her to a motel room, where he, the Winchesters, Castiel, and Rowena explain the situation to her and try to convince her to abort the nephilim. Kelly agrees to help them lure Rooney in so they can use the Hyperbolic Pulse Generator to expel Lucifer from him. They succeed, but Kelly runs away from the motel room.

In "Family Feud", an angel sent by Heaven to get rid of the child of Lucifer finds Kelly on the run and attempts to kill her, but she is saved by Dagon, a Prince of Hell who was personally created by Lucifer. Kelly is persuaded by Dagon to accept her as her and her child's protector. In "The British Invasion", Kelly, uncomfortable with the situation, demands to see a doctor. Dagon agrees to take her, but when the doctor notices something on the sonogram, she controls him to tell her that everything is fine. Later, Sam, impersonating the doctor, tells Kelly to come back to the office. She is kidnapped by Dean, who takes her to a junkyard where Sam, Eileen Leahy, Mick Davies, and Renny Rawlings are waiting. Sam tries to explain that they just want to help her, but Dagon comes and takes her away again. In the melee, Eileen accidentally shoots Renny. Back at their hideout, Dagon handcuffs Kelly to the bed, no longer trusting her, and reveals that giving birth to a nephilim is always fatal to the mother.

In "The Future", Kelly, worried about her child being evil, attempts to kill herself, but the nephilim brings her back to life. Castiel, Kelvin, and Hozai come to the hideout to kill Kelly, but when Castiel reaches the basement he is unable to kill her. Castiel kidnaps her and takes her to a motel while he decides what to do. He decides to take her to the sandbox portal to Heaven, where Kelly and her child will die instantly but their souls will ascend to Heaven. Kelly, having seen visions from her child, now believes in its goodness. The Winchesters track them down and explain that they can extract the grace from the fetus so it will be born as a normal human being. Kelly refuses, as she believes her child has an important destiny, and drives off in the Impala with Castiel, having been told by her child that taking this path would lead to its birth. They are greeted at the sandbox by Joshua, who is then killed by Dagon. Sam and Dean arrive, and in the melee, Kelly takes Castiel's hand, lending him some of the nephilim's powers, which he uses to destroy Dagon. Castiel then takes Kelly to a safe place to give birth, having been shown by the nephilim a vision of a future paradise.

In "All Along the Watchtower", Kelly prepares for the birth of her child in a remote location with Castiel and laments that she will not be around to raise it. Kelly makes a video for her child to watch. As Kelly goes into labor, a rift into another universe opens up, and Mary Winchester comforts her through her contractions as they bond over their protectiveness of their respective sons. Kelly dies giving birth to a son, Jack.

In "Lost and Found", Jack states that Kelly is in Heaven. He recalls his connection with his mother in the womb, where he learned that Castiel was supposed to be his protector. Kelly is given a traditional Hunter's funeral. In "Patience", Jack watches the video Kelly made. In "The Big Empty", Jack shows grief counselor shapeshifter Mia the video and asks her to take his mother's form. Mia, in Kelly's form, comforts Jack and assures him he is not destined to be evil. In "Tombstone", Castiel tells Jack that Kelly would be proud of him.

In "Gods and Monsters", Jack visits his grandparents, Kelly's parents, claiming to be Kelly's friend, unable to tell them that she is dead or that he is their grandson. They show him photo albums with pictures of Kelly and remark on his resemblance to her.

During "Byzantium", Jack dies and ascends to Heaven but leaves his personal Heaven to find his mother's. Jack finds Kelly enjoying a childhood memory before approaching her and revealing his identity. Turning her back to her adult form, Kelly is greatly shocked and happy to meet him with the pair hugging. It takes Kelly a while to recall she is dead before she inquires on Jack's reasons for being present, Kelly soon realizes that he's dead too and breaks down but he comforts her that Castiel did protect him but something happened. Kelly asks what's bothering, as he explains a strange entity is chasing him. She hides her son and promises to stay by his side before Castiel arrives, having deduced Jack would be there. Castiel catches up with Kelly and soon tells them that Jack will be resurrected though part of his soul will be burned. Kelly is unsure about the idea, forcing Castiel to elaborate on the being chasing Jack, The Shadow, who wants to send him to The Empty, the resting place of angels. Kelly protects her son from the Shadow when it attacks, and witnesses Castiel make a deal with the entity to save Jack. Kelly then says goodbye to Jack, telling him to have a great life, before Castiel takes him back to Earth, resurrected. In "Moriah", Jack learns that Kelly's parents have learned that she is missing and possibly dead.

In season 15's "Destiny's Child", one of the memories that Jack experiences as his soul is restored is of talking with Kelly in Heaven. In "Inherit the Earth", after becoming the new God, Jack tells Sam and Dean that it is because of what he learned from them, Kelly, and Castiel that he is ready for his new responsibilities.

Jimmy Novak
James "Jimmy" Novak, portrayed by Misha Collins, is the vessel of Castiel and a former ad salesman for AM radio with a wife and daughter. He is described by Castiel as a "devout man" who agreed to become Castiel's vessel after hearing his voice and undergoing a series of tests of faith. In "The Rapture", after Castiel is forcibly taken back to Heaven for "re-conditioning", Jimmy is left alone and found by Sam and Dean. He describes being possessed by Castiel as "being chained to a comet". He wishes to return to his family, but Sam and Dean insist that he would put them in danger from the demons hunting him down for his association with angels. Jimmy sneaks back home to reunite with his family, but he and his family are attacked by demons, and his wife and daughter are kidnapped by them. Castiel returns and possesses Claire to vanquish the demons. Jimmy is fatally injured in the fight, and Castiel tells him he will now be at peace in Heaven. Jimmy begs Castiel to use him as a vessel instead of Claire to spare her the life of being an angel's vessel. Castiel accepts and possesses Jimmy again.

Castiel reveals to Jimmy's daughter Claire, that Jimmy has been dead and his soul in Heaven since his vessel was destroyed in his first confrontation with Raphael in "Lucifer Rising". Jimmy was reunited in Heaven with his wife, Amelia, after her death in "Angel Heart". In "All Along the Watchtower", Castiel uses Jimmy's name to rent a cabin for himself and Kelly Kline. After tracking the omens to the area, the Winchesters realize they have found the right spot when they learn Castiel used the name James Novak since that is his vessel. After Castiel's death in the same episode, the Winchesters give him a Hunter's Funeral by burning Jimmy's body in "Lost & Found." When Castiel is resurrected, Jimmy's body is restored to act as his vessel once again.

As seen in season 13's "Exodus", the Apocalypse World Castiel also chose his world's Jimmy as his vessel unlike most of the angels of that world who have different vessels. The Apocalypse World Castiel's version of Jimmy has a darker more scruffier appearance, coinciding with the alternate Castiel's evil nature. He also appears to be blind in one eye. This Jimmy and Castiel are killed by the Winchesters Castiel.

In season 14's "Gods and Monsters", Castiel talks about Jimmy with Lucifer's former vessel Nick. Castiel admits that while Jimmy was willing to be his vessel, he is dead, causing Nick to call Castiel a stone-cold body snatcher that is no better than Lucifer. Castiel tells Nick that in his millennia of existence, what befell Jimmy and his family is Castiel's greatest regret.

Josie Sands
Josie Sands, portrayed by Alaina Huffman, is a Men of Letters initiate and the primary vessel of the Knight of Hell Abaddon.

Josie first appears in season 8's "As Time Goes By" on the night of her final initiation into the Men of Letters. As later revealed, Josie was already possessed by the Knight of Hell Abaddon at this point and Abaddon was using Josie to get close to the Men of Letters Elders. During Josie's initiation, Abaddon attacks and kills all of the Elders aside from Larry Ganem who attempt to exorcise the demon from Josie with no luck. After being followed to 2013, Henry attempts to get Josie to retake control, but Abaddon claims that Josie is gone. Unable to kill Abaddon, Henry later shoots a bullet carved with a devil's trap into Josie's head, trapping Abaddon in Josie's body and rendering her powerless. Dean then cuts off her head and states an intention to cut the body up into tiny pieces and bury her in cement to forever entomb Abaddon.

In "Clip Show", the Winchesters watch a video recorded by Josie and left in the Men of Letters archive of a failed attempt at curing a demon by Father Max Thompson in 1957. Later, they put Josie's body back together as part of their plan to use the demon cure on Abaddon. As a result, Josie's head is left sewed onto her neck, but her hands remain detached as a precaution. Abaddon reveals that she learned of Josie from Father Thompson before murdering him and possessed Josie to infiltrate the Men of Letters. After freeing herself, Abaddon flees in Josie's body. She reappears, still in Josie, in "Sacrifice" where though Josie's hands have been reattached, her head is still visibly sewn onto her neck. To defeat Abaddon, Sam sets her alight in Holy Fire, forcing Abaddon to flee Josie's body. If Josie had still been alive at this point, she died.

In season 9's "Devil May Care", Josie's charred body is retrieved by a demon working for Abaddon. The demon performs a ritual that restores Josie's body to perfect condition and it is repossessed by Abaddon. It is unknown if the ritual also resurrected Josie as demons do not require a living vessel. While watching video footage of Abaddon helping a few demons get better vessels, the Winchesters are surprised to recognize Josie as Abaddon's vessel as they had thought her body damaged beyond Abaddon's use. For the rest of season 9, Josie remains the Knight of Hell's vessel.

Josie appears in flashbacks in "Mother's Little Helper", where, shortly before their initiation, Josie and Henry are sent to investigate an apparent case of demonic possession in a convent. Josie, disguised as a nun, is revealed to be in love with Henry despite his being married with a son and is disgruntled by the nuns' treatment of her. After exorcising several demons, the two are confronted by Abaddon in the body of the Mother Superior. After Abaddon knocks out Henry and threatens to possess him, Josie volunteers to act as Abaddon's vessel to spare Henry. Abaddon is amused to realize that it is because Josie loves Henry and taunts her, but ultimately accepts her offer. After possessing Josie, Abaddon tells another demon she intends to use Josie to study the Men of Letters before she destroys them and then poses as Josie, successfully fooling Henry. She also subtly threatens Sister Julia Wilkerson, the only witness, into staying silent. In 2014, while investigating similar murders in town, Sam meets Julia who tells him about what she witnessed in 1958. Recognizing who Henry and Josie must have been, Sam is shocked to learn about the incident and discovers the truth about what Henry and Josie investigated which had been believed at the time to simply be a case of multiple demonic possessions.

In "King of the Damned", Dean kills Abaddon with The First Blade while she is possessing Josie's body. The First Blade's effects appear to burn out Josie's eyes similar to an angel smiting and Dean, under the influence of the Mark of Cain, further mutilates her corpse before being stopped by Sam. If Josie had in fact been resurrected with the restoration of her body for Abaddon's use, she dies for a second time along with the Knight of Hell.

Kevin Tran
Kevin, portrayed by Osric Chau, is a Prophet of the Lord who is chosen to interpret the Word of God after Sam and Dean break it out of the slab of stone it is trapped in. He is in advanced placement and is preparing for college when he is struck by lightning and chosen. Kevin is driven to drive his mother's car to the mental institution where Castiel is and where Sam and Dean have taken the Word. He steals the Word, but Sam and Meg catch him. Castiel reveals that Kevin is a Prophet and can thus read the tablet which talks about the Leviathans.

After two angels arrive to take him away and are driven away by Dean, they take him to Rufus' Cabin where they set him to work on translating the tablet. The angels return, but after Meg kills one to save Castiel, the others allow Kevin to finish the translation before taking him home. Kevin reunites with his mother, but they discover to their horror that the detective investigating his disappearance is the Leviathan Edgar in disguise. Edgar kills the two angels accompanying Kevin and takes him and his mother prisoner.

Dick Roman later uses Kevin's mother to force Kevin to translate the tablet for him. After the Leviathans bring in a girl named Polly, Kevin manages to escape the room he's trapped in and learns of Dick's plan to poison coffee creamers to kill all the skinny people in the world, but is captured by Dick's assistant Susan before he can escape the building. During Sam, Dean and Castiel's break-in of Sucrocorp, Sam finds and rescues Kevin who reveals Dick's new plan to him and insists they need to blow up Dick's laboratory.

In the lab, they find Dean and Castiel killing Dick and Kevin is shocked when Dean and Castiel disappear when Dick explodes. Kevin nervously tells Sam they have to leave because more Leviathans will be coming, but Crowley shows up and reveals he has it taken care of and kidnaps Kevin as a prize. It is later revealed that he wants Kevin to translate another Word of God tablet so he can learn how to open all the gates of Hell and release every demon in existence upon the world. Kevin tricks Crowley and escapes, going on the run for a year before Sam and Dean catch up to him. Kevin reveals that he has learned that it is possible to seal the gates of Hell forever and banish all demons from the Earth from the tablet and Sam and Dean decide to do so with his help.

However, Crowley catches up with them and although they escape thanks to Kevin's quick thinking, Crowley murders his girlfriend in revenge. Kevin later convinces Sam and Dean to take him to see his mom who is surrounded by demons. After they rescue her, Mrs. Tran joins them in closing the gates of Hell, but they find the tablet stolen and being sold at an auction. Kevin's mom wins the auction by bidding her soul, but Crowley possesses her and gets away with the tablet. In the struggle, Dean tries to kill Crowley even though he is possessing Kevin's mother and in doing so, loses Kevin's trust. This along with the fact that Crowley warned him that the Winchesters have a habit of using people up and disposing of them when they no longer need them, causes Kevin to flee with his mother. He spends the next several episodes on the run from both Crowley and the Winchesters, but after his mother hires a witch to get the ingredients needed for the spell he used to kill the demons and escape, Crowley captures and tortures him to force him to translate the tablet. Sam, Dean and Castiel, who are alerted to his situation when Mrs. Tran calls them for help, arrive and rescue Kevin and get half of the tablet, but Crowley gets the other half and Kevin loses a finger, though Castiel is able to regrow it. They then call in Garth to look after the Trans and he takes them to his houseboat where Kevin works on translating the half of the tablet he has to no avail. Dean and Castiel later go to Kevin for help in preparing more demon bombs to rescue the angel Samandriel.

Kevin is now so focused on translating the tablet that he has somewhat let himself go and has a disheveled appearance. He has also sent his own mother away so he can work in solitude, explaining to Dean that he can't enjoy the world he is trying to save until it is saved. Though he does not believe it is possible to get the ingredients needed for the bomb as they are rare, he gives them the list and Castiel is able to get them. It is shown in "Trial and Error" that Kevin lets himself go completely while he focuses on translating the tablet, believing that closing the gates of Hell will be the only way he can go back to a normal life. Eventually, after weeks of non-stop work, he cracks the instructions and calls Sam and Dean to let them know. Kevin learns that to close the gates, someone must complete three trials and recite an Enochian spell after each one. Kevin has only cracked the first trial which is to kill a hellhound and bathe in its blood. Despite Sam's advice to slow down, Kevin begins taking stimulants to keep awake and eventually calls Sam and Dean to inform them that he has learned that hellhounds are usually invisible but can be seen through an object scorched with Holy Fire, giving them a way to see the hellhound so they can kill it. In "Taxi Driver", Kevin is under so much stress that he is hallucinating Crowley in his head and that Crowley is mentally torturing him. Panicked, he calls Sam and Dean and hides, but has also deciphered the second trial: Sam must rescue an innocent soul from Hell and release it into Heaven. After Sam leaves to rescue Bobby Singer's soul from Hell, Dean stays with Kevin, trying to calm him down. Kevin is so freaked out he hides in a closet and later hides his half of the tablet somewhere, believing it will take the pressure off of him. After Dean leaves, Kevin demon-proofs Garth's houseboat even more, but Crowley shows up and reveals he killed Kevin's mother and got his location from her smartphone. When Sam and Dean return they find the boat deserted. In "The Great Escapist", Kevin is trapped in an illusion of Garth's houseboat and is tricked into translating Crowley's half of the demon tablet by demons pretending to be Sam and Dean. At the same time, a prerecorded message Kevin prepared is sent to Sam and Dean with his notes on the tablet. While Sam and Dean do not figure out the trial from them, they eventually lead them to Metatron, the angelic scribe who wrote the Word of God. Eventually Kevin realizes the truth as the demons are too polite and sends them into a trap. Crowley confronts him and Kevin refuses to reveal more than the fact that Crowley has no idea the power he could have gotten from his half of the demon tablet and that he won't break. Not caring as he has the angel tablet, Crowley strangles Kevin who is rescued by Metatron. Metatron takes Kevin back to the hotel where he lives and heals him and Kevin reveals that he has Crowley's half of the demon tablet with him. With that half of the tablet, Kevin has learned the third trial: cure a demon. Kevin is left confused as to who Metatron is when Metatron reveals knowledge of the third trial as well. After Sam and Dean pretend to make a deal with Crowley to stop him killing people they have saved, Kevin digs up the first half of the demon tablet and reunites the two halves, giving the tablet to Sam and Dean who send him to the Men of Letters bunker for safety. When Dean and Castiel need to know the third trial to close the gates of Heaven, they take the angel tablet to Kevin who is distraught as he believed that it would be over once he was done with the demon tablet, causing an angry Castiel to yell at him that he is a Prophet until he dies. After completing the second trial, Dean calls Kevin who tells him that while he has found trials on the angel tablet, he does not see anything that matches what they have done. When Naomi shows up to tell Dean and Castiel that Metatron is really trying to expel all angels from Heaven, Kevin listens, but is unable to confirm what she has said. He later tries to leave the bunker, but stops when alarms start going off, signaling the fall of all angels to Earth.

After the angels fall, Kevin is left trapped in the bunker as it locks down and he panics, nearly shooting Dean with a crossbow when he arrives. Kevin is not happy to see that the Winchesters have Crowley captive and have not killed him. Kevin is put to work trying to find a way to reverse Metatron's spell using the angel tablet. When Dean calls Kevin to get him to confirm their cover at a military base, Kevin succeeds by hacking into the person he is talking to's computer and blackmailing them. He later gets a call from Abaddon and passes on her message to Sam and Dean and at their request, looks through the archives for a way to kill a Knight of Hell. Crowley, who is in a dungeon in the next room, taunts Kevin, causing Kevin to beat him with a sledgehammer. Crowley then claims that he never killed Kevin's mother and will lead Kevin to her if he releases him and that the Winchesters are just using him. While Kevin does not release Crowley, he decides to leave and look for his mother but is stopped by Dean who convinces him that his mother is as good as dead even if she is still alive. Dean tells him that the Winchesters consider both him and Castiel to be family and would die to protect him if need be. Kevin aids Sam and Dean with finding a spell to communicate with animals and is later asked by Dean to find a way to suppress an angel. Kevin finds a way, but is murdered by Gadreel possessing Sam soon afterwards on Metatron's orders. Dean burns his body in a Hunter's Funeral afterwards and is devastated by and blames himself for Kevin's death. A month after his death, Kevin returns as a ghost, having been stuck in the veil between worlds due to Heaven being closed. Kevin asks Sam and Dean to rescue his mother who he has learned from another ghost named Candy is still alive. With Candy's help, Sam and Dean track down Linda who tearfully reunites with Kevin. Despite the risks, Linda decides to take the ring Kevin is attached to and look after him until he can enter Heaven. Kevin similarly wants to look after his mother now that he has her back. Kevin informs Sam that he does not blame him for his death, aware that it was really Gadreel and asks Sam and Dean to put aside their differences and start being brothers again before leaving.

Two years later in "All in the Family", Kevin's ghost is called in by God in the form of Chuck Shurley to reassure the Winchesters that they can trust Him. The Winchesters are shocked to see Kevin who tells them that they can trust Chuck and that whatever He has planned for them, He must believe they can do it. Kevin tells the Winchesters that he's fine for someone who is dead before Chuck tells Kevin that he has been stuck in the veil between life and death for too long. With a wave of His hand, Chuck causes Kevin's soul to ascend to its rightful place in Heaven.

In season 15's "Raising Hell", Kevin unexpectedly returns to help Dean and Arthur Ketch against the souls God released from Hell. Kevin explains that God lied about sending him to Heaven and instead cast Kevin's soul into Hell where he was released when God opened all the doors of Hell. Due to being cast into Hell by God himself, Kevin's reputation allows him to push around the other souls and he attempts to help in the plan to trap the souls. However, Francis Tumblety, also known as Jack the Ripper, learned from demons about Kevin's connection to the Winchesters and the ghosts turn against him. After a failed attempt to use Kevin as leverage, the escaped ghosts, aside from Kevin, are trapped in a crystal by Rowena. Afterwards, having learned from Belphegor that being cast into Hell means he can never get into Heaven, Kevin requests to be released from the barrier so that he can wander the Earth as a ghost. Though being an untethered ghost means he might eventually go crazy, Kevin prefers that fate to returning to an eternity of torture in Hell. After a final goodbye with the Winchesters, Kevin leaves through a doorway Belphegor opens in the barrier and vanishes to wander the world.

Apocalypse World Kevin Tran
In season 13's "War of the Worlds", an alternate universe Kevin appears as a Prophet loyal to Michael in Apocalypse World. He meets Lucifer and the latter informs him of his counterpart's status, which shocks him. Having a more black-and-white view of the world, Kevin sees Lucifer as evil due to his status as the Devil and apparently can't tell that Michael is just using him and doesn't care either way as Michael promises him a better life once he gets to the Winchesters world. Kevin finds a spell on the Angel Tablet that will open a rift to the Winchesters' universe, but it requires the grace of an archangel so Michael drains some of Lucifer's. Kevin's spell succeeds in opening a rift, but Lucifer uses the opportunity to escape through the rift which closes behind him. Kevin is excited by his success despite the fact that the spell only opens the rift long enough for one person to go through. Kevin is ordered by Michael to fix the problem.

This version of Kevin and his actions are subsequently mentioned by Lucifer to Castiel after they reunite following Lucifer's escape from Apocalypse World. Lucifer warns Castiel of the danger of Kevin working to open another rift for Michael who intends to invade their world. Castiel later shares the story with the Winchesters in "Devil's Bargain." After hearing how Kevin used the Angel Tablet to find a way to open the rift, the Winchesters bring in Prophet Donatello Redfield to search the Demon Tablet for a similar spell. Though Donatello succeeds in "Good Intentions", his lack of a soul in comparison to Kevin causes the tablet's power to corrupt him.

In "Unfinished Business", Kevin is found by Jack, Mary Winchester and a few resistance fighters in Michael's abandoned fortress. Kevin claims to have perfected the spell from the Angel Tablet for Michael who intends to use it to open a rift and lead and invasion of the Winchesters' universe. As Jack prepares to go after Michael, Kevin reveals that he has been left behind as a trap to break Jack by showing him that he can't protect everyone. Having been promised by Michael that he will be reunited with his mother in Heaven, a desperate Kevin refuses to be talked down and activates a sigil burned into his chest that effectively turns Kevin into a suicide bomb. The blast kills Kevin and three resistance fighters, though Jack survives unharmed and shields Mary from the blast's effects. As Michael hoped, the suicide bombing devastates Jack from his inability to protect the people he cares about. Its later shown that Kevin also lied about perfecting the spell for Michael and that the lie was a part of the trap as Michael had no way to open a rift until Lucifer provided him with the spell from the Demon Tablet in "Exodus."

Linda Tran
Linda Tran (played by Khaira Ledeyo in season 7, played by Lauren Tom in season 8 and onward) is Kevin's mother and is first heard when she calls him about a test he has to take in "Reading is Fundamental." When Kevin disappears, Linda grows frantic and calls the police and is relieved when two angels return him to her. However, the detective she called in to help turns out to be the Leviathan Edgar and he kills the angels and captures her and her son.

In "There Will Be Blood", Linda is used as a hostage to force Kevin into translating the Leviathan Tablet for Dick Roman, but she is let go with a warning not to talk afterwards.

A year later in "What's Up, Tiger Mommy?" she still hasn't heard from Kevin and is unknown to her, surrounded by demons, keeping an eye on her and protecting her. At Kevin's insistence, the Winchesters rescue her and she joins them in their quest to close the gates of Hell forever. Linda proves to be strong-willed, withstanding getting an anti-possession tattoo easily while comforting Kevin (and also indicating to her son's surprise that it is not her first tattoo) and later using her knowledge of tax law to intimidate a pawn shop owner into telling them what they need to know when nothing else works. At the auction, when all else fails, she bids her own soul to save Kevin, though she is warned that she will survive though she will wish she didn't. She refuses the offer of angelic protection for Kevin from Samandriel and is captured by Beau and Crowley who burn off her tattoo and Crowley possesses her to get the tablet. In the struggle that follows, Dean tries to kill her to kill Crowley and he flees her body, getting the tablet. Linda survives, but is left catatonic by the experience, though Sam and Dean believe she will recover due to her strong-willed nature. However, the incident shatters Kevin's faith in the Winchesters and he goes on the run with her.

By the time of "A Little Slice of Kevin", Linda has recovered from her catatonia and looks for a way to strike back against Crowley by hiring a witch off of Craigslist to get the ingredients needed for the demon bomb. The witch brings enough ingredients for one bomb instead of all that Linda specified and betrays them to Crowley. Crowley leaves a demon behind to kill Linda as he leaves with Kevin, but Linda overpowers and captures the demon instead and calls Sam and Dean for help to rescue Kevin. She brings them the ingredients, Kevin's notes on how to build the bomb and the demon allowing them to locate Kevin and launch a rescue mission. While Linda wants to help, Sam handcuffs her to her steering wheel to keep her out of the way and out of danger. Kevin is rescued and Sam chides her for calling upon a witch for help. He and Dean call upon Garth to look after Linda and Kevin and he takes them to a houseboat he uses as a safe house. Kevin, wanting to work in solitude to translate the half of the tablet that Castiel retrieved, later sends Linda elsewhere, explaining to Dean that he can't enjoy the world he is trying to save until it is saved.

In "Trial and Error", Kevin reveals that while he sent Linda away, he still does talk to her on the phone, but all she does is cry.

In "Taxi Driver", Crowley finds Kevin, claiming that he captured Linda and tortured her for Kevin's location. Crowley states that Linda did not break, so he killed her and got the location off of her smartphone.

In "Devil May Care", Crowley claims that he did not actually kill Linda and that she wishes that she was dead and promises to take Kevin to her if he releases him. Unsure whether to believe Crowley or not, Kevin doesn't free him, but decides to look for himself before being stopped by Dean who tells him that even if Linda is still alive, she is as good as dead.

In "Captives", the ghost of Kevin returns to ask Sam and Dean to rescue Linda who he has learned is still alive from another ghost named Candy. With Candy's help, Sam and Dean track down Linda in a storage unit in Wichita, Kansas where she and Sam end up trapped together due to the demon Del who has been holding Linda captive and torturing her. Using her knowledge of electronics from helping Kevin with his school projects, Linda is able to get them out of the room they are trapped in and is devastated to learn of Kevin's death. After Del is captured, Sam and Dean let Linda kill him. At Linda's demand, they then take her to the bunker where Linda is reunited with the ghost of her son. Linda finds her husband's old ring, the object Kevin is attached to and decides to take him home with her despite the risks so she can look after him until he can enter Heaven. Kevin was later allowed to ascend to Heaven by God.

In season 13's "Unfinished Business", the Apocalypse World version of Kevin reveals that his version of Linda died in front of him during the Apocalypse. Kevin has been promised that he will be reunited with Linda in Heaven if he suicide bombs the human resistance which he feels is his only chance to see his mother again. As a result, Kevin refuses to be talked down, though Jack and Mary Winchester survive the bombing.

Lisa Braeden
Lisa Braeden, portrayed by Cindy Sampson, is a woman Dean spent a weekend with around 1999. In the third-season episode "The Kids Are Alright", Dean decides to visit Lisa and he discovers she has an eight-year-old son named Ben who shares his cocky attitude and love of classic rock. After Ben is kidnapped by a changeling who committed the murders,

Lisa was furious and took off with Ben. She is next seen in "Mannequin 3: The Reckoning", after Maggie tells Ben to lure Dean into returning. Telling Crowley to kidnapping Lisa and Ben to give Maggie to kill them, Lisa is possessed by a demon and fatally shot in the heart, killing her

Magnus
Magnus (born Cuthbert Sinclair), portrayed by Kavan Smith, is a former Man of Letters who has caused Sam and Dean trouble directly and indirectly on two occasions. Magnus was a powerful magician who was so good at spells, he was made the Men of Letters Master of Spells right after he was initiated into the order. He acted as Henry Winchester, Sam and Dean's grandfather's mentor and designed most of the warding for the Men of Letters bunker. However, he felt that the Men of Letters should be more proactive, using their knowledge to fight evil instead of hiding it away and protecting it. Magnus' ideas got so radical that after he created the Werther Box, a vault designed to protect an important decryption codex but with a deadly alarm system, he was kicked out of the Men of Letters on May 16, 1956. As a result, he survived the massacre of the order by Abaddon in 1958. Crowley became aware of his separation from the Men of Letters and attempted to locate him to get into the Men of Letters bunker, but failed to find him. At some point Magnus changed his name from Cuthbert Sinclair to Magnus, the name the Men of Letters use while going incognito, long enough that he hadn't gone by it in a long time by 2014 and built himself a warded impenetrable hideout where he collected important supernatural artifacts and a zoo of various creatures including vampires and shapeshifters. Due to his proficiency with spells, Magnus made himself immortal, looking forever to be in his 30s despite being much older. Several weeks before the events of "Blade Runners", Magnus tracked down the mythical First Blade and acquired it for his collection. Searching for the First Blade to kill Abaddon, Sam and Dean tracked down Magnus with the help of the Men of Letters files and Crowley and got him to talk to them by mentioning their grandfather and the Men of Letters. However, upon learning that Dean had the Mark of Cain, Magnus decided to add him to his collection rather than help them and teleported Sam outside. Magnus worked to convince Dean to work with him and then attempted to brainwash him when that failed. Eventually Sam and Crowley managed to break in and while Magnus was distracted with Sam, Crowley freed Dean who decapitated Magnus with the First Blade to save his brother. A year later in "The Werther Project", Sam learned of Magnus' connection to the Werther Box while searching for the codex inside. Following the destruction of the Men of Letters, Magnus' creation had caused at least four deaths and Sam and Dean set out to disarm it and get the codex. They eventually discovered that Magnus had designed the box so that only all of the blood of a Man of Letters could disarm the spell and open it, but by combining their blood, the Winchesters were able to safely open it. After getting the codex, Dean destroyed the Werther Box just to be safe.

In season 15's "Last Holiday", Jack discovers that Magnus rescued a wood nymph dubbed Mrs. Butters from the Thule and indoctrinated her into being a weapon against the Men of Letters enemies. Mrs. Butters turns on Jack and the Winchesters before they convince her that Magnus was just using her and to stand down.

Mick Davies
Michael "Mick" Davies is an operative from the British Men of Letters, portrayed by Adam Fergus. When he was a young boy, Mick was orphaned and spent some time living on the streets. In an attempt to get some money, he picked the pocket of a member of the British Men of Letters and accidentally stole a cursed coin. The British Men of Letters saw potential within Mick and sent him to the Kendricks School. At the Kendricks Academy, Mick was best friends with a boy named Timothy. He was also classmates with Arthur Ketch who called them "survivors" when describing their experience years later.

One day in 1987, Mick and Timothy were pulled into the office of Doctor Hess, the Headmistress and one of the British Men of Letters Elders. To ensure they would follow the code absolutely, Doctor Hess left them a knife and told them only one of them could leave the room alive. While Timothy wanted to run, Mick reluctantly killed his best friend, per the code. This event would haunt him for the rest of his life.

In "Season 12, Mamma Mia", Mick comes to America to return Toni Bevell to London, where she'll face consequences after establishing that she's gone way off her original mission, which was to identify American hunters and gain their trust.

He first discovers Ms. Watt's corpse and calls Toni to inform her of his intentions, calling her a "bad girl". After Toni has a face-off with Mary Winchester, Mick arrives with Castiel at her location. He insists that he and the British Men of Letters wish to work with the Winchesters and he even gives them his number, but they don't trust him.

In the car, he tells Toni that she must fly back to London, and that Mr. Ketch, whom he's already called, will take it from here.

In "LOTUS", Sam calls Mick for help with Lucifer but hangs up when he gets Mick's voicemail. Realizing that the Winchesters are likely in trouble, Mick sends Arthur Ketch to help them, resulting in Arthur rescuing them from the Secret Service and supplying them with a device capable of exorcising Lucifer.

In "First Blood", Mick is shown using a typewriter to discuss some of the events that were occurring in the episode. He is writing to his superiors, and he mainly talks about the Winchesters and American hunters in general. He is first shown trying to convince a hunter named Wally to work for the British Men of Letters. Wally's rejection leads Mick to remark that American hunters are "difficult". He then talks about Sam and Dean, who managed to escape Site 94, but they left survivors behind. He then remarks that it is Arthur Ketch's purpose to clean up "loose ends". He describes how Arthur took over Site 94 before the Government decided to shut it down completely. Lastly, Mick is shown talking to Mary Winchester, offering her the same things he offered Wally, but Mary shows interest instead.

In "The Raid", Mick leads an operation with several American hunters to wipe out all of the vampires in America. Within a month, Mick's operation wipes out two hundred and thirty of the two hundred and forty one vampires in the Midwest. After Mary gets Sam to check out his operation, Mick shows him around and includes him in a briefing of their planned attack on the final vampire nest in the Midwest.

Shortly afterwards, the compound comes under attack by vampires and Mick is shocked to learn that the Alpha Vampire is behind it as the British Men of Letters intel places him in Morocco for at least a decade. Mick is further shocked when Sam admits to having seen the Alpha Vampire in Hoople, North Dakota five years before. When Mary calls for everyone to show any weapons they possess, Mick has nothing useful and admits to having never taken a life before. While discussing options for taking down the Alpha Vampire, Mary has Mick show Sam the Colt, the one weapon the British Men of Letters possess capable of harming the Alpha. Sam is able to provide Mick with a ritual created by Bobby Singer to make more bullets for the Colt and Mick performs it moments before the Alpha Vampire breaks in and kills two hunters.

After killing the two hunters, the Alpha Vampire announces his intention to force Mick to contact his superiors and tell them the mission failed before draining Mick on camera. Before he can follow through on his threat, Sam and Mary return and Sam arms himself with the empty Colt. As Sam negotiates with the Alpha Vampire, Mick discreetly shows him the bullet for the Colt he has palmed and then attacks Sam in apparent anger after Sam offers Mick up to the Alpha Vampire in exchange for the safety of himself and his family. In reality, Mick slips Sam the Colt bullet which he loads thanks to a distraction from Mary. As Mick and Mary watch, Sam kills the Alpha Vampire with the Colt.

Following the battle, Mick berates Arthur Ketch who had been trying to recruit Dean in his own way and was thus away during the battle. Sam tells Mick that he is now in as despite everything that went wrong, they kill the Alpha Vampire and Mick's operation is making the world a better place.

In "Somewhere Between Heaven and Hell", Mick sends Sam text messages with cases for the Winchesters to take. As Mick calls him at the end of the episode, Sam admits the truth to Dean who decides to give Mick a chance.

In "Ladies Drink Free", Mick brings the Winchesters a werewolf case and asks to accompany them to get actual experience in the field. Though reluctant, Dean agrees to take Mick along. While the Winchesters talk to victim Hayden Foster's mother, Mick disguises himself as a doctor and examines her wounds, discovering that she has been bitten. Mick lies to the Winchesters about it and returns that night to kill Hayden with a silver nitrate injection as per British Men of Letters protocol, something he is visibly reluctant to do. After Hayden awakens and attacks him, clawing open Mick's shoulder, Mick uses the silver nitrate injection to kill her.

The next day, Mick joins the Winchesters in investigating Hayden's "mysterious" death, seeming conflicted by his actions. He later accompanies Dean to a bar to interrogate Hayden's boyfriend with his behavior drawing Dean's suspicions. Dean realizes that Mick murdered Hayden and is enraged by his actions since Hayden was an innocent sixteen-year-old girl and as a pureblood werewolf, could have controlled herself.

After Claire Novak is bitten, Mick advocates killing her while Sam wants to try a cure the British Men of Letters invented involving injecting the newly turned werewolf with the blood of their sire. As the Winchesters go to track down Claire's sire, they leave Mick with Claire, warning him that if he kills her, they will kill Mick. As Claire starts to turn, she begs Mick to kill her, believing that she cannot control herself. However, while Mick admits that all of his instincts are telling him to do it, he's starting to understand that his instincts are wrong and instead plans to tie up and sedate Claire. They are then attacked by Claire's sire, Justin, who kidnaps Claire and knocks Mick unconscious.

The Winchesters return to find Claire gone and Mick waking up. Mick tells them that they can track Claire as he slipped a tracking device into her coat. Finding Justin's home through Mick's tracking device, Mick and Sam attack Justin with Mick jabbing Justin in the back with a syringe to get his blood. However, they are both quickly thrown off and Justin attacks Dean. Before Justin can kill Dean, Mick kills Justin with a silver bullet to the heart from behind. Mick then removes the vial of blood from Justin's back and uses it to cure Claire. The next morning, the Winchesters thank Mick for giving them a win and give him a second chance as a result. Mick is amazed by Claire's survival and curing and calls her a miracle to which Dean agrees with him.

In "The British Invasion", Mick is haunted by memories of murdering his best friend Timothy as a child and visits the Men of Letters bunker where he spends all night drinking with the Winchesters after learning about Lucifer's child. The next morning, Mick receives word from Doctor Hess that they don't have time to convince the American hunters to join them and orders Mick to "assimilate or eliminate" them and sends her lackey Renny Rawlings to keep an eye on him.

Mick and Renny join the Winchesters attempt to capture Kelly Kline. While initially successful, Dagon shows up, shrugs off all of their attacks and escapes. Eileen Leahy tries to kill Dagon with the Colt, but she teleports away, causing the bullet to kill Renny. Mick initially tries to kill Eileen per the British Men of Letters code, but Sam convinces Mick to follow his own code instead and he orders them to go. Later, Mick returns to his headquarters to find Arthur Ketch and Doctor Hess. Having learned his lesson from working with the Winchesters, Mick defends the Winchesters way of doing things as opposed to the British Men of Letters code. Mick tells Doctor Hess that their code would have a young boy murder his best friend but he's no longer a boy, he's a man now. In response, Doctor Hess signals Arthur who shoots Mick in the back of the head at point-blank range with a silenced pistol, killing him. Standing over Mick's body, Doctor Hess announces that the experiment with the American hunters is a failure and they are going to kill the Winchesters now.

In "The Memory Remains", Arthur sends the Winchesters an email posing as Mick to send them on a case to get them out of the bunker. He poses as Mick again later in a text message to check that they are in fact gone. When the Winchesters call Mick to check in, Arthur answers and claims that Mick was recalled to London and "has a lot to answer for" after what happened with Dagon so they will now report to him.

In "Twigs & Twine & Tasha Banes", Mary starts to get suspicious about Mick's disappearance as he hasn't responded to her phone calls or emails for weeks. Afterwards, Mary gets an email from "Mick" claiming that he is to remain in London for a few more weeks. Hearing Arthur talking about a package in the armory, Mary checks it out and discovers a box containing Mick's body, upsetting Mary. After finding Mick's body and finding information on hunters being chased by the British Men of Letters, Mary confronts Arthur who claims he was killed by a werewolf. However, Mary quickly realizes that Arthur is lying and in fact killed Mick himself since he was shot in the head which a werewolf is unlikely to do.

In "There's Something About Mary", after learning of the British Men of Letters attack on American hunters, the Winchesters capture Lady Toni Bevell for answers. When they question what Mick thinks about it, Toni reveals that Mick is dead, much to their obvious shock and grief as the Winchesters had genuinely liked Mick.

Missouri Moseley
Missouri Moseley, portrayed by Loretta Devine, is a very talented psychic residing in Lawrence, Kansas. She was a long-time friend of John Winchester. Missouri first met John on December 17, 1983, when he came to her for a reading. She said it was 'a few days after' Mary was murdered. Missouri said she was the one who opened his eyes to 'what was in the dark.' John took Missouri to his house, hoping she could tell him what killed Mary. Unfortunately, Missouri could not tell what it was, just that it was "real evil". Twelve years later, Missouri returns in season 13's "Patience." Missouri, who is revealed to also be a former hunter, contacts the Winchesters for help when a monster targeting psychics kills her protégé. Missouri helps Dean and Jody Mills determine that they are dealing with a Wraith and she receives a premonition of her own death. Missouri sends Dean and Jody away to protect her granddaughter Patience Turner, who is also a powerful psychic and allows the Wraith to kill her, having seen that this is the path that will ensure its destruction. With help from Patience, Dean kills the Wraith and avenges Missouri's death while also fulfilling her last wish to see her granddaughter protected. In the process, Patience learns that her father lied to her for most of her life about her grandmother.

Nick
Nick, portrayed by Mark Pellegrino, is a widower and Lucifer's primary and most well known vessel. Though Nick himself only initially appears in person in season 5's "Sympathy for the Devil", he plays a major role from seasons five to thirteen as Lucifer's vessel. He subsequently joins the main cast in season 14 after the death of Lucifer.

In season 5's "Sympathy for the Devil", Nick, who has recently lost his wife Sarah and son Teddy in a brutal home invasion, is tormented by visions created by Lucifer regarding the loss of his family. Lucifer, appearing in the form of Nick's dead wife, approaches Nick openly eventually and asks for Nick's permission to take Nick as his vessel. Though Lucifer can't bring back Nick's family, he offers Nick the chance to get revenge against God and explains his version of why God threw Lucifer out of Heaven. Nick ultimately consents to becoming Lucifer's vessel.

Subsequently, Nick appears throughout season 5 as Lucifer's vessel. In "Free to Be You and Me", Lucifer visits Sam in Nick's form and explains that Sam is actually Lucifer's one true vessel. Nick was just a backup plan and can barely contain Lucifer without spontaneously combusting which is not a problem that Lucifer would face with Sam. As a result of Lucifer's sheer power, Nick's body slowly degrades over season 5 as Lucifer's power burns him out and he develops ever worsening skin lesions. Several characters note the state of Nick's body over the course of the season with Castiel stating in "Two Minutes to Midnight" that Lucifer has to drink gallons of demon blood just to keep it intact at all. In "Swan Song", after Sam says yes to Lucifer, he abandons Nick's body for Sam's. Nick is left dead on the ground, completely burned out from containing Lucifer for nearly a year.

In season 7, Sam's hallucinations of Lucifer take on the form of Nick. In season 11's "O Brother, Where Art Thou?" and "The Devil in the Details", Lucifer manifests in Hell to communicate with Sam. In "Hell's Angel", despite having Castiel as his vessel at the time, Lucifer takes on Nick's form in Castiel's mind to battle Crowley when he tries to get Castiel to expel Lucifer. When Lucifer is yanked out of Castiel's body in "We Happy Few" by the Darkness, an image of Nick is briefly overlaid over Castiel as Lucifer is expelled.

In season 12's "Stuck in the Middle (With You)" and "Family Feud", Lucifer is revealed to be imprisoned in Nick's body rather than the Cage after he was exorcised from the President of the United States in "LOTUS." In "Family Feud", Crowley explains to Lucifer that his demons found Nick's body a few years before and Crowley had it repaired and upgraded so that it could serve as the perfect vessel and perfect prison for the archangel who was sent into Nick when Crowley perverted Rowena's spell to send him back to the Cage. Crowley's improvements keep Nick's body from degrading again and he remains a sound vessel for Lucifer without fear of burning out like Lucifer's previous vessels aside from Sam did. Although Crowley installs a security system in Nick's body to control Lucifer, it is reversed upon Crowley with the help of Drexel in "There's Something About Mary" and Lucifer gains full control over his vessel. After his escape, Doctor Hess shows Sam surveillance photos of Lucifer on the loose again in "Who We Are" and Sam believes her as he recognizes Lucifer's old vessel.

Throughout the second half of season 12 and all of season 13, Nick acts as Lucifer's permanent vessel. Lucifer is eventually killed by Dean in "Let the Good Times Roll", leaving Nick's body lying on the floor of a church surrounded by the burned impressions of Lucifer's wings.

In season 14's "Stranger in a Strange Land", Nick is revealed to still be alive, living in a makeshift bedroom in the Men of Letters bunker's dungeon. Sam speculates that as the archangel blade is designed to kill the archangel inside and not the vessel, it left Nick unharmed aside from a slowly healing wound in his side where he was stabbed. Nick has nightmares of his time under Lucifer's control and Sam and Mary Winchester have a hard time looking at him due to his long possession by Lucifer and thus his resemblance to him. Nick is able to remember that Michael told Lucifer that he wanted to "do it right this time", but can't provide Sam with any more useful information than that on Michael's plans.

In "Gods and Monsters", Nick is visited by Castiel in his room where Nick experiences flashbacks of the things Lucifer forced him to do. Castiel reminds Nick that it was the murder of Nick's family that caused Nick to consent to Lucifer's possession, causing Nick to experience flashbacks of how Lucifer tortured him to get Nick to say "yes." Nick digs into the murder of his family and discovers that the case has never been solved in all the years since the murder, enraging him. As Nick displays uncharacteristically aggressive and Lucifer-like behavior, Castiel determines that though Lucifer is gone, he may have done more damage to Nick's psyche than they realized. In an attempt to solve his family's murders and get revenge, Nick visits his old neighbor Arty who was a witness to a man running out of his house the night of the murders, but subsequently changed his story. Believing someone to have gotten to Arty, Nick attacks him and demands to know the truth. Nick later bashes Arty's head in with a hammer, the same way his family was murdered. In "The Scar", Castiel tells Sam and the returned Dean that Nick took off claiming that he had personal matters to attend to and hasn't been returning Castiel's phone calls since.

In "Unhuman Nature", Nick continues his bloody quest for revenge, torturing a priest whom Arty had confessed to and then brutally murdering him when the priest refuses to break his vows and tell Nick what he knows. Nick then meets with the reporter who covered his family's murders in hopes of learning something useful. At Nick's request, the reporter reveals that a man named Frank Kellogg was the beat cop in Nick's neighborhood at the time of the murders. Nick is subsequently tempted to murder a prostitute, but stops himself. Nick tracks down and tortures Frank, having learned from Arty that he had seen a cop running out of Nick's house at the time of the murder and then been threatened by the police into silence. Frank finally reveals that he responded to a 911 call from Nick's wife reporting a prowler only to meet a man named Abraxas outside of Nick's house and then wake up in his police cruiser covered in Sarah's blood. Nick realizes that Abraxas was a demon who possessed Frank to murder Nick's family. Even though Nick acknowledges that the murders weren't Frank's fault, he still beats the man to death with a hammer regardless as Frank's hands were used to butcher his wife and son. In the aftermath, Nick prays to Lucifer, having realized that he enjoyed the freedom that came with expressing his inner darkness and is now missing the fallen archangel. In the Empty, a skeletal figure rises with glowing red eyes, presumably Lucifer awakened by Nick's prayer.

In "Damaged Goods", Nick continues his revenge quest by capturing and torturing demons to find Abraxas. Nick finally learns that Abraxas was captured by Mary Winchester while he was slaughtering a Girl Scout troop and sets out to Hibbing, Minnesota to find Mary. Nick's behavior alarms a local grocery store clerk who calls local Sheriff Donna Hanscum who discovers that the van Nick is driving is stolen while his fingerprints show Nick as being wanted for his murder spree. Nick subdues Donna and tracks Mary down through Donna's phone, kidnapping Mary who admits that she locked Abraxas in an Enochian puzzle box when she couldn't defeat him. Nick forces Mary to lead him to the storage unit where Abraxas is located and kidnaps a security guard to act as Abraxas' vessel. Nick frees Abraxas who offers him answers in exchange for Nick murdering Mary. Before he can, Nick is confronted by the Winchesters who tracked him down with Donna's help. Nick breaks the devil's trap and Abraxas attacks before revealing that he murdered Nick's family on Lucifer's orders and that Nick was chosen, although for no special reason. While Abraxas is distracted by Dean, Nick kills him with an angel blade to avenge his wife and son and is then subdued by Donna and Mary. Nick is arrested by Donna for his murder spree and justifies his actions as necessary to get revenge. Sam apologizes for not being able to save Nick or his victims, who will haunt Nick for the rest of his life.

In "Prophet and Loss", Nick escapes after brutally beating up a cop and returns to his old house where he encounters the ghost of his wife Sarah. Even though Nick has gotten her revenge by killing Abraxas, Sarah can't rest due to Nick's inability to give up Lucifer. Unable to give Lucifer up even for Sarah, Nick departs to continue his search for the archangel.

In "Game Night", Nick kidnaps the prophet Donatello Redfield and claims to have injected him with thallium. Nick resists the Winchesters' attempts to get him to reveal Donatello's location and enjoys taunting them. Finally, he agrees to lead them to Donatello while Jack discovers that Nick injected Donatello with angel grace, not poison. Nick explains that he used Donatello as a conduit to communicate with Lucifer in the Empty and intends to bring him back. Nick bashes Sam's head in with a rock, leaving him severely injured, before fleeing to an abandoned cabin to perform a spell Lucifer gave him using Jack's blood. Nick succeeds in bringing Lucifer back from the Empty, but is interrupted by Jack and Mary. Jack sends Lucifer back to the Empty and causes Nick to burn up from the inside, killing him before healing Sam's injuries. Nick's body is later found by Sam and Dean in "Absence." Sam covers up Nick's body with a blanket, but it is apparently otherwise just left in the abandoned cabin. Despite wanting Nick dead, Sam is horrified by the brutal manner of his demise.

In season 15's "Inherit the Earth", a resurrected Lucifer returns in the form of Nick. However, it's unclear if Nick was resurrected as well. When Lucifer is killed for a second time by Michael, he explodes into ash, leaving nothing of Nick behind.

Pamela Barnes
Pamela Barnes, portrayed by Traci Dinwiddie, is a friend of Bobby Singer. A skilled psychic, she is bold and aggressive. Bobby calls upon her assistance in discovering what pulled Dean Winchester out of Hell in season 4. She holds a seance and discovers it is a being named Castiel. In attempting to get a glimpse of Castiel, her eyes are burnt out and she becomes permanently blind. However, her psychic abilities appear to enable her to perceive her surroundings. The Winchesters again seek her assistance in finding out why Anna Milton can hear angels speak. She expresses an interest in "dicking over" angels because one caused the loss of her sight. She places Anna under hypnosis, which restores to Anna her memories of being an angel. She is called upon one more time by the Winchesters, to help them perform astral projections of themselves. While doing so, she is mortally wounded by a demon, but as her dying act, whispers a warning to Sam to stop using the demonic forces within him. In season 5's "Dark Side of the Moon", the Winchester brothers encounter Pamela in Heaven, who is happy residing in her own private paradise.

Pamela reappears in season 14's "Nihilism" where, in the world Michael created for Dean in his mind, he owns a bar with Pamela and is happy, experiencing a looped existence. When Sam and Castiel enter Dean's mind, they are surprised to find Pamela present and after they remind Dean of her blindness and death respectively, Pamela becomes blind and then disappears, having only been a construct of Dean's imagination.

Toni Bevell
Lady Antonia "Toni" Bevell, portrayed by Elizabeth Blackmore, is a Woman of Letters from British Men of Letters.

In "Season 11, Alpha and Omega", Toni returns to her home in London only to get a call that something bad is happening. She heads to her basement where she observes a bulletin board decorated with information on the Winchester family.

She bids her sleeping son goodbye and prepares to head out. Her servant gives her a few weapons before she leaves.

When Sam and Castiel return to the Bunker after the sun was restored to normal, she uses the angel banishing sigil on Castiel and tells Sam that she is a member of the British Men of Letters. When she asks about Dean, Sam tells her he's dead.

Toni tells Sam that she has come to take him to see the Boss at the London Chapter of the Men of Letters. She accuses him of playing with things - Archangels, Leviathans, the Darkness - bigger than he can handle. She soon fires a gun at him, leaving Sam's fate uncertain.

In "Season 12, Keep Calm and Carry On", Toni brings Sam, who she shot in the leg, to Dr. Marion to have his injuries treated, paying him with $100,000 to not ask questions. Taking him to a farmhouse, Toni explains that the British Men of Letters have kept Britain safe from monsters for forty years and want to do the same with America. To this end, she demands information on all of the hunters in America, their leadership and how to contact them. When Sam refuses to tell her, Toni has Ms. Watt torture him for the information, but he continues to refuse. Though Ms. Watt suggests bringing in Mr. Ketch, Toni refuses as she doesn't like the man and instead decides to resort to mental torture, causing Sam to have hallucinations of dead people in an attempt to break his mind. However, when Dean calls her and threatens Toni if she doesn't turn over Sam, she sends Ms. Watt to kill him. Eventually, Sam apparently commits suicide as a result of his hallucinations, but in actuality tricks Toni and briefly overpowers her. Sam nearly escapes, but Toni manages to lock him in the basement once again.

In "Mamma Mia", Toni uses a spell and potion to create a hallucination where she seduces Sam to get information from him. She is unable to get much before Sam sees through it and Toni resumes her physical torture. As she tortures Sam, Toni gets a call from Mick informing her that Ms. Watt is dead and he has come to bring her in as she's gone too far. Toni refuses to stop and captures Dean when he locates the farmhouse with help from Ms. Watt's cell phone and Castiel. Toni threatens to torture Dean instead but before she can begin, a resurrected Mary Winchester threatens her at gunpoint. Toni and Mary engage in a fight that ends with Toni cutting open her hand and mentally strangling Mary while Dean threatens her with Mary's gun. Toni demands the gun, stating Mary will die if she is killed and Dean pretends to comply. As Dean hands over the gun, he punches Toni unconscious, having recognized that she was using a Chinese mind control technique and that knocking her out would end its effects.

The group is then interrupted by Mick who explains that Toni's orders were to make contact with the Winchesters but she went too far out of her belief of their being a malfeasance in the American hunters. Mick promises that Toni will be punished in London for her actions and departs with her. Toni remains steadfast in her desire to get answers, but Mick refuses though he tells her if necessary, he will do what he has to do to deal with the situation. To that end, he has called for Mr. Ketch, something that leaves Toni visibly uneasy.

In "The Raid", Arthur Ketch has a drink with Dean and tells him that Toni's rogue actions were unforeseen by all but Arthur who "had a sneak peak at what a neurotic, overreaching time bomb she was." Arthur then explains that he and Toni used to date which Dean is not surprised by.

In "Twigs & Twine & Tasha Banes" and "There's Something About Mary", Toni returns to brainwash Mary into being a remorseless killer for the British Men of Letters. Toni succeeds, but is lured into a trap and captured by the Winchesters. Toni informs them of Mick Davies' murder and confirms that her organization is likely responsible for the death of American hunters. At the bunker, the Winchesters are ambushed by Arthur Ketch and three operatives. After killing Arthur's men, a brainwashed Mary forces them to let Arthur go. Arthur then locks the Winchesters in the bunker, initiating a lockdown that cuts off all power, water and air which will result in their suffocation in two to three days. As Toni is a rival for heading the American operation, Arthur locks her in the bunker to die with the Winchesters.

In "Who We Are" Toni claims that she is the only person that can undo Mary's brainwashing to get the Winchesters to spare her. For two days, the Winchesters and Toni work together to find a way out with a magical solution ultimately failing. As the three are on the verge of dying, Dean uses a grenade launcher to blast a hole into the sewers, a plan that Toni feels is insane. Dean then hits the bunker's manual override and save Sam and Toni.

After learning that Jody Mills has captured Mary, the Winchesters demand that Toni break the brainwashing and she finally admits to lying to them about being able to do it. Toni suggests the Winchesters run and watches Sam's rallying speech to the American hunters with apparent interest. Toni agrees to help Dean enter Mary's mind using equipment at the bunker and asks in return that Dean give her a head start before killing Toni so that she can have a chance to see her son one last time. With Toni's help, Dean breaks Mary's brainwashing, but awakens to find that Arthur Ketch has murdered Toni while he was unconscious.

Doctor Hess
Doctor Hess, portrayed by Gillian Barber, is a British Men of Letters Elder and the Headmistress of the Kendricks Academy.

In 1987, Doctor Hess forced Kendricks student Mick Davies to murder his best friend Timothy as a test of Mick's loyalty to the British Men of Letters code.

In "The British Invasion", Doctor Hess contacts Mick and orders him to "assimilate or eliminate" the American hunters. To ensure Mick's compliance, Doctor Hess sends her lackey Renny Rawlings to watch over him. Following the accidental death of Renny at the hands of Eileen Leahy and the Colt, Doctor Hess personally comes to the British Men of Letters compound, leaving Britain for apparently the first time. After determining that Mick has become too much like the American hunters, Doctor Hess has Arthur Ketch murder him and announces that they will now wipe out the American hunters, particularly the Winchesters.

In "There's Something About Mary" and "Who We Are", Doctor Hess personally coordinates an operation to wipe out the American hunters. She suggests to both Arthur Ketch and Lady Toni Bevell that once it is over, she will place each of them in charge.

As her operatives prepare to strike against the hunters, their families and any bystanders, an assault team of American hunters led by Sam Winchester attacks the British compound. Despite being heavily outnumbered and outgunned, the American hunters slaughter the British operatives, taking some casualties of their own. Desperate, Doctor Hess kills a hunter and retreats to the control room to call for extraction, but the people in Britain can't get her out. She is then confronted at gunpoint by Sam, Jody Mills and another hunter named Walt. Doctor Hess attempts to convince Sam that they still need each other as Lucifer has escaped and Crowley is dead. After a moment of consideration, Sam refuses Doctor Hess' offer and pointedly destroys the computer she was using to communicate with Britain. Enraged, Doctor Hess attempts to shoot Sam only to be shot through the head herself by Jody Mills. The American hunters then destroy the British compound, ending their operation and threat in America.

In "All Along the Watchtower", Sam shares the intelligence Doctor Hess gave him on Lucifer with Dean and Mary. Sam is shown to believe Doctor Hess' claims as he recognizes Lucifer's vessel from the surveillance pictures Doctor Hess shared with him.

Victor Henriksen
Victor Henriksen, played by Charles Malik Whitfield, was an FBI agent who pursued the Winchesters since the bank "robbery" in the season two episode "Nightshifter". He believed the Winchesters were serial killers responsible for the deaths that have occurred in various towns. He continued to pursue them when, in the season three episode "Jus in Bello", he finally captured them and held them in a small town jail while waiting for an FBI helicopter to arrive. However, demons arrived and destroyed the helicopter; one of them possessed Henriksen but was exorcised. Finally believing in the supernatural, he agreed to help the Winchesters as they fought off the demon horde. Afterwards, he agreed to tell the FBI that they were in the helicopter when it crashed. However, after the Winchesters left, he was killed by Lilith. Henriksen made another appearance in season four's "Are You There, God? It's Me...Dean Winchester". Lilith was breaking the 66 Seals to free Lucifer, and one of them was the Rising of the Witnesses. Sam, Dean, and Bobby met the ghosts of people they could not save, including Henriksen, who told them what happened after they left the jail at the end of "Jus in Bello". The ghosts terrorized the trio until they were put to rest.

Mr. Wyatt
Sam's teacher at Truman High in 1997. Mr. Wyatt takes an interest in Sam after reading his precocious written assignment about hunting werewolves, which was supposed to be nonfiction. Wyatt interprets the work as an allegory and an in-depth character study about family dynamics, encouraging Sam to pursue the academic life he wants to attain without being shackled to family dictates.

Sam and Dean return to Truman High in the season 4 episode "After School Special" to hunt a vengeful spirit that's been terrorizing the school grounds by possessing students and making them do hideous things to bullies. Sam takes some time to chat with Mr. Wyatt in a miniature reunion to thank him for giving him advice and acting as a counselor when he attended the school.

Other supernatural beings

The Alpha Vampire
The Alpha Vampire, portrayed by Rick Worthy is the first member of the vampire species. He was created by Eve and spread vampirism afterwards. When Crowley starts a hunt for Alphas to locate Purgatory, he starts sending telepathic messages to his "children" to create as many new vampires as they can. Dean sees this message when he's briefly infected with vampirism and the Campbells use it to track him down and capture him. The Alpha is tortured, but eventually breaks free, killing Christian Campbell. After a fight, Christian, who is revealed to be possessed by a demon, gets up and injects him with dead man's blood, incapacitating him. Afterwards, Crowley arrives and takes him away. The Alpha is held with all the other captured monsters in Crowley's prison, but escapes before Castiel can kill him like he does the other Alphas and monsters in the prison. The Alpha makes a deal with the Leviathans to share humanity among both species with the Leviathan substance that makes humans more docile making it easier for vampires to feed. After several of his vampires die after feeding on infected humans, the Alpha flees to his retreat at an old monastery where Sam and Dean track him down. However, Emily, a young woman he'd held prisoner for twelve years, calls him to warn him that they're coming. The Alpha captures Sam and Dean who ask for his blood, explaining that the Leviathan substance was what killed his vampires and that he'd been betrayed. The Alpha refuses to listen and after hearing that Edgar has arrived, orders the hunters locked up. The Alpha confronts Edgar who confirms Sam and Dean's story, telling him that the Leviathans intend to use the fact that so many monsters feed on humans to wipe them out. When Edgar insults Eve, the Alpha attacks him, throwing Borax in his face, but Edgar overpowers him. Before Edgar can kill the Alpha, Sam and Dean, who broke free, attack and Sam decapitates Edgar. Grateful for their actions and understanding that they have a common enemy, the Alpha gives Sam and Dean his blood without a fight and allows them to take a young boy named Alan he has captured. As they leave, warning him not to keep Edgar's head too close to his body, the Alpha taunts them that they truly want to kill him instead of leaving it for another time and promises to "see you next season."

The Alpha Vampire returns in "The Raid" when the British Men of Letters begin systematically wiping out all of the vampires in America. The Alpha Vampire leads an assault on the British compound where he faces off with Sam who arms himself with the Colt, the only weapon the British possess capable of harming the Alpha Vampire. Sam offers the Alpha Vampire a deal where he can have the British if he will leave the Winchesters alone to resume the old way of hunting. Sam is then attacked by Mick Davies and the Alpha Vampire by Mary Winchester before both are defeated. Sam then reveals to the Alpha Vampire it was all a distraction so he could get and load a bullet for the Colt. Impressed, the Alpha Vampire calls Sam a "clever, clever boy" before Sam shoots him through the head with the Colt. As the legendary gun's power works on him, the Alpha Vampire briefly laughs and smiles before dropping to the ground, dead.

Amy Pond
Portrayed by Emma Grabinsky as an adolescent and by Jewel Staite as an adult. Amy was a Kitsune who grew up traveling around with her mother. In 1998, they crossed paths with Sam Winchester in Lincoln, Nebraska. Amy killed her mother to protect Sam, with whom she had grown close. Amy re-encountered Sam years later. Sam tracked her down after she committed a series of murders. Amy then reveals that she had only committed the murders to strengthen her sick son Jacob. Given the circumstances, and their history, Sam agrees to let her go and makes Dean promise to do the same. However, Dean later returns and kills Amy. He spares her son, who vows revenge. Dean lies to Sam about Amy's fate but is plagued by guilt. The truth is eventually revealed and is a source of conflict between the brothers for a time.

Amy's name is a nod to the Doctor Who character of the same name.

Benny Lafitte
Benjamin "Benny" Lafitte (Ty Olsson) is a vampire who was a vampire pirate during his first lifetime until he met Andrea Kormos and fell in love with her, leaving his nest and stopping feeding on humans. He was eventually tracked down and killed by his nest mates and went to Purgatory where he spent around fifty years before Dean ended up there after killing Dick Roman. Benny saves Dean from another vampire and makes a deal with him: in exchange for Dean taking him with him, Benny will show him a portal out of Purgatory. Benny helps Dean find Castiel, warning him that traveling with an angel will get them killed, but Dean is insistent on all of them getting out. After Benny saves Castiel from Leviathans, he earns Dean's full trust and Dean carries him out of Purgatory in his arm. On Earth, Dean travels to Benny's grave and resurrects him. The two remain in touch but stay separate until Benny goes after his nest for revenge and to protect himself from further attempts on his life. After Benny is injured, he calls Dean for help and together they take down the nest, with Benny killing his maker. However, Benny is reunited with Andrea who he learns was turned into a vampire instead of being killed. She helps him out, but to Benny's heartbreak, he learns that she has changed and wants to take over the pirating operation herself and Dean is forced to kill her to save Benny. Needing something to keep him on the straight and narrow, Benny moves to his hometown of Carencro, Louisiana where he meets and secretly looks out for his great-granddaughter Elizabeth. Rogue vampire Desmond tries to get Benny to join him, but Benny refuses and Desmond leaves a trail of bodies to try to get Benny to agree, drawing the attention of insane hunter Martin Creaser and Sam and Dean. Dean and Benny hunt down and kill Desmond, but Martin tries to kill Benny, using Elizabeth as a hostage. Benny is forced to kill him in self-defense and is left in a deteriorating situation worsened by the fact that Dean soon afterwards cuts off all contact. When Sam gets trapped in Purgatory, Dean goes to Benny for help, knowing he can get Sam out. Benny agrees, telling Dean he feels he no longer fits in on Earth. Dean kills Benny who saves Sam and Bobby Singer from vampires and leads them to the portal out. However Benny, who never intended to return to Earth, stays behind to hold off a group of vampires and allow Sam to escape. Benny is last seen fighting the vampires. Benny finally gains Sam's acceptance with this self-sacrifice and Dean buries his body instead of burning it in hopes of bringing him back one day.

In season 10's "The Werther Project", Dean experiences a hallucination of Purgatory while under the influence of the Werther Box. In the hallucination, Benny saves Dean from a Leviathan and encourages Dean to end his own life as part of the box's magical manipulations. Though pleased to see his old friend again, Dean recognizes that he is not the real Benny as Benny would never want Dean to kill himself. Dean impales Benny through the chest with his own weapon, dissipating the illusion.

In season 12's "Mamma Mia", Lady Toni Bevell of the British Men of Letters attempts to question Dean about his relationship with Benny to no avail. Benny, who is always referred to only by his first name, is revealed to have the full name of Benny Lafitte, previously suggested by the sign on the land Dean found Benny's corpse buried on in "We Need to Talk About Kevin."

In season 15's "Atomic Monsters", Sam experiences a nightmare of a world where he has given into his demon blood addiction and become the leader of a demon army. Benny is a part of a force of hunters led by Dean to stop Sam, but is mortally wounded in the conflict. Benny promises to see Dean on the other side before dying of his injuries, Dean being killed a short time later by Sam for trying to stop him. Sam later suspects that he is seeing God's potential endings for the Winchester brothers. In "The Trap", God reveals that Sam's visions, including the one of Benny, are actually God's memories of alternate realities and what happened to the Sams and Deans in those worlds.

In "The Trap", Dean and Castiel return to Purgatory in search of a Leviathan Blossom for the spell to trap God. Dean suggests to Castiel that they keep an eye out for Benny, figuring that Benny probably took over Purgatory by now. However, a Leviathan they capture reveals that Benny, who is a legend for escaping from Purgatory and then coming back, is dead. After he helped Sam escape from Purgatory, Benny was torn apart by other vampires for his actions. Dean is devastated to learn of his friend's final fate after everything that Benny had done for him and Sam.

Chuck Shurley / God
Chuck Shurley, also known by the pseudonym Carver Edlund and portrayed by Rob Benedict, is an author of a marginalized book series Supernatural, which recounts everything the Winchester brothers have experienced during the show's run. After confronting him about his seemingly omniscient knowledge of their escapades, it is revealed that he is a Prophet of the Lord, and his works will become new gospels. Between the fourth-season finale "Lucifer Rising" and the fifth-season premiere "Sympathy for the Devil", he witnesses the death of Castiel at the hands of the archangel Raphael. Being the author of the Supernatural series, he attends the first Supernatural convention Sam and Dean were tricked into attending. When it turns out the hotel is actually haunted, he is forced to occupy the guests and the hotel staff while the Winchesters and a pair of cosplayers destroy the ghosts. When the hotel manager leaves and breaks the salt line, he dissipates the ghost with an iron post, unintentionally gaining the affections of Becky.

In "Swan Song", Chuck is periodically narrating about the history of the Impala, his script having the same name as the episode. He informs Dean of the final battlefield between Michael and Lucifer, despite the angels wishing him not to know. At its conclusion, while ending the narration, Chuck smiles and disappears into thin air, leading some to question whether he is merely a prophet that is no longer needed or is actually God. Castiel later states that while he doesn't know what happened to Chuck, he must be dead as a new Prophet was chosen in the form of Kevin Tran and that only happens when the old Prophet dies.

In the Season 10 episode "Fan Fiction" Chuck is shown to be alive as he reappears at the end of a play based on his books and comments that it was "not bad" when asked his opinion by the play's writer, Marie.

In the Season 11 episode "Don't Call Me Shurley", Metatron is transported to a bar that he recognizes as one of God's constructs where he meets with Chuck. After Metatron criticizes his writing, Chuck reveals to the shocked Metatron that he is in fact God, having taken on the form of Chuck Shurley to have a more hands-on role. God explains that after the Apocalypse was averted, He traveled the world but has grown tired of everything and intends to let Amara destroy the world while He works on His autobiography with Metatron's help. God gives Metatron several insights into His actions, confirming He resurrected Castiel several times to aid the Winchesters and revealing he "turned off" Dean's amulet's ability to detect him. He also shows sympathy for Lucifer, stating that Lucifer is not a villain. God is generally apathetic to what's going on on Earth, but Metatron gives Him an impassioned speech about how humanity is better than Him because for all their flaws, they still try. After finishing his autobiography, God has Metatron read it while he plays "Dink's Song" on his guitar. On Earth, God stops Amara's insanity infection and resurrects those who died because of it. After finding Dean's old amulet glowing in Sam's pocket, the brothers follow it to the middle of the street where God, in the form of Chuck, is helping those affected by Amara. The Winchesters are shocked to realize that Chuck was God the whole time and God tells them they should talk.

In "All in the Family", God proves who he is by transporting the Winchesters to the bunker and calling upon the spirit of Kevin Tran to confirm his story. The Winchesters then learn from Metatron that God intends to sacrifice himself to the Darkness to save the universe rather than fight her. After the Winchesters rescue Lucifer, God greets his rebellious son for the first time in millennia and heals his numerous injuries from Amara's torture. In "We Happy Few" there is great tension between God and Lucifer, but the Winchesters get them to have a sit-down in which God admits Lucifer was always his favorite and he feels he failed him by giving him the Mark. Lucifer and God reconcile and gather the witches, angels and demons to aid them in battling Amara since Raphael was dead, Gabriel was presumed dead, God couldn't bring them back in time, and Michael is insane. Together, they defeat the Darkness and God goes to transfer the Mark to Sam to imprison his sister once more, but the Darkness retaliates, leaving God mortally wounded. In "Alpha and Omega", God reluctantly aids the Winchesters in formulating a plan to kill the Darkness to balance the scales once he's dead. As God grows weaker and the universe dies with him, the Darkness teleports him to her location where Dean has convinced her to find another way. The Darkness admits she was jealous of no longer being everything to God and asks to have her brother back. The siblings reconcile and the Darkness heals the injuries she inflicted upon God, reversing the end of the universe. The two siblings then depart the Earth together for a "family meeting."

Chuck/God later appears in the season 14 finale "Moriah", where he tries to convince the Winchesters that Jack Kline has become too powerful and needs to be stopped. After much persuading, God manages to get the Winchesters on his side. However, As Dean prepares to execute Jack with the Colt, Sam realizes that God is enjoying the scene. The Winchesters and Castiel then discover that their entire lives have been nothing more than stories for Chuck/God's sadistic amusement. When the Winchesters confront him on his manipulations (culminating in Dean telling him to "go to Hell"), God responds by killing Jack himself. As he prepares to leave, Chuck is shot and wounded by Sam, causing him to declare "The end" of their story, unleash the souls of hell and leave.

Weakened by the Colt, Chuck seeks help from Amara in Reno. Amara, however, realizes that Chuck has never changed as a person, and leaves him trapped on earth. Chuck then meets with Becky, and tells her of his "ending" to the story of the Winchesters. When Becky is horrified by his idea, Chuck reveals himself to be God before presumably killing her and her family. 
 
God later traps Sam and Eileen in a casino, whose occupants he murdered. Knowing that Dean and Castiel are working to defeat him, Chuck shows Sam visions of the "future" if they win. In it, Castiel is corrupted by the Mark of Cain, and the Winchesters are eventually turned into monsters and killed by Bobby Singer and Jody Mills. Broken by these visions, Sam does not help his brother and Castiel kill God when they arrive. Chuck then manages to heal himself, before revealing that the visions were actually from other worlds. He then departs, leaving the Winchesters, Castiel, and Eileen in the casino.

God/Chuck later enters a store in another world, where he reveals himself as being a sociopathic narcissist who sees the Winchesters as "toys" that exist for his amusement. He then decides to annihilate all the other universes he created. As the clerk begs for his world to be spared, Chuck tells him that "everything will be alright." Chuck then proceeds to destroy the other earth as well.

Having eliminated the other worlds, God returns to the main world, where he meets with Amara. God explains his view of humans as "boring" creatures who "ruin everything they touch". After much debating, Amara traps her brother in the Winchesters' bunker, having previously agreed to help them defeat him. As Dean brings Jack, who is intended to be a bomb, to the bunker, Sam arrives, revealing that their plan will result in Billie, the current "death", to take Chuck's place. Chuck then reveals that he organized the entire event to pit the brothers against each other. Dean tries to ignore Sam's warning's, going as far as threatening to shoot him, before calming down. Chuck then reveals that the Winchesters intend to kill Amara  as well, causing her to give in and let him absorb her and her powers. Infuriated that the Winchesters have again defied him, God declares that he is done with them, and leaves after wounding Jack.

In "Inherit the Earth", the Winchesters discover that God has killed all other life on the planet. In a bid of desperation, they contact him, and offer to kill each other in exchange for Chuck bringing back everything else. Chuck, however, reveals that he has decided to let them suffer in a lifeless world. He later sadistically kills a dog the Winchesters found. God then revives his son Lucifer, and sends him to steal his "deathbook" from the Winchesters. Lucifer, however, is killed by his brother Michael, who has since sided with the Winchesters.

Michael later betrays the Winchesters and summons God in an attempt to become his "favorite" again. God, however, executes Michael for his earlier betrayal. He then reveals to the Winchesters that he now intends to "cancel" their "show" and begins savagely beating them. The Winchesters, despite serious injuries, begin to laugh, much to Chuck's confusion. Jack then ambushes Chuck and drains him of all his power. The Winchesters reveal that Jack has been able to harness the energy from Lucifer, Michael, and now God by watching their fights. Chuck accepts his defeat and prepares to be killed, only for the Winchesters to reveal that they instead have chosen to let him live as a mortal and die forgotten. The Winchesters and Jack then leave a horrified Chuck alone in the woods.

In The Winchesters, it's revealed that God had created the Akrida as a failsafe in case of his defeat: monsters that threatened to finish what God had started and destroy all of creation, including the Multiverse which Jack had restored following God's defeat. Breaking Jack's rules about no interference, Dean guides alternate reality versions of his parents and their friends to destroy the Akrida, foiling God's plan once and for all. Although God himself doesn't appear in The Winchesters, Rob Benedict makes a cameo appearance as a band member named Tango in one episode.

The Darkness
The Darkness, often called by her other name Amara, and portrayed primarily by Emily Swallow, is a supremely powerful primordial entity who has existed since before the beginning of time, along with her brother God. She is described as the darkness that existed before Creation. Sometime later, God came into being. He created the Archangels to fight a terrible war against her. Through the combined power of God and the Archangels, God sealed her away, not wanting to kill her, by using the Mark of Cain as both a lock and key. God revealed that he chose not to kill her in her weakened state as they both needed to be alive because light cannot exist without darkness, and killing Amara would disrupt the balance that reality is founded upon, destroying it. The Archangels battled her and thus knew of her existence, but she is so ancient and mysterious that the Demons and the Angels, besides the Archangels and Metatron, God's scribe, did not believe she existed. During the eleventh season, she escapes her prison to get revenge on her brother, but she and God reconcile by the end of the season.

In season 15, Amara returns, enjoying a peaceful life on Earth and wanting nothing to do with her brother and his plans to destroy everything. The Winchesters discover that to kill Chuck, they must also kill Amara to avoid the universe coming to an end. After learning that Dean has betrayed her, Amara allows Chuck to absorb her so that they can once again become one. However, she is still alive somewhere within Chuck. After Jack absorbs Chuck's power and becomes the new God, he tells the Winchesters that he and Amara exist in harmony.

Death
Death, portrayed by Julian Richings, is an immensely powerful entity also called The Grim Reaper or the Pale Horseman. He is neither demon nor angel, and states he is "as old as God."

In the climax of "Abandon All Hope", Lucifer performs a bloody ritual to raise Death, and to bind him to Lucifer's apocalyptic bidding. In "Dead Men Don't Wear Plaid", Death goes to Bobby's hometown of Sioux Falls and resurrects many deceased locals as undead; this includes Bobby's wife. The revived at first appear and act normal, but soon take on feral states; this forces others to kill them in self-preservation. These events were an attempt to break Bobby, one of the few remaining influences keeping Sam from agreeing to be Lucifer's vessel. In "The Devil You Know", Bobby temporarily sells his soul to Crowley to locate Death. In "Two Minutes to Midnight" — Death's first corporeal appearance — Death arrives in Chicago to precipitate a storm which would kill three million. His vehicle is a pale white 1959 Cadillac. In a lengthy conversation with Dean, he reveals that this and other actions is the influence of Lucifer's binding spell, which Death wishes to break. He presents Dean with his ring, the final piece allowing the Winchesters to open Lucifer's cage and re-imprison Lucifer. "Two Minutes to Midnight" also introduces Death's taste for the typical, renowned, and often unhealthy local restaurant foods of the places he visits, which becomes something of a running gag.

Death appears again in "Appointment in Samarra", in which Dean attempts to convince him to retrieve Sam's soul from Lucifer's cage. Death agrees to do so if Dean performs Death's duties for an uninterrupted 24 hours. Although Dean fails, the Horseman still restores Sam's soul, regarding the Winchesters as "useful". He also forms a wall between Sam's active consciousness and the debilitating memories of his time in Lucifer's cage.

In season seven when Castiel proclaims himself God, the Winchesters summon and bind Death as part of a plan to stop Castiel; Death takes an instant dislike to him. He informs the angel that he is not God and that he is harboring something else within him, the Leviathans, that will soon break free. Castiel removes the Winchesters' bind and leaves. Death, of his own free will, creates another eclipse, giving the Winchesters and Castiel a chance to return the souls to Purgatory before they destroy his vessel. Castiel succeeds in sending the souls back, but the Leviathans manage to hold on and escape into the world.

In "I Think I'm Gonna Like It Here", when Sam is dying, Death comes to reap him personally, intimating that he considers it an honor. He also states that, though he usually does not pass judgment, he finds all Sam's actions "well-played." Sam requests, and Death agrees, to make it so that Sam dies permanently, such that no one and nothing can bring him back to life. Ezekiel, in Dean's form, interrupts them, however, and Death allows them to talk, saying that it is Sam's choice if he lives or dies. Sam chooses to live, ultimately, and Ezekiel possesses him to heal the damage the trials inflicted.

In "Brother's Keeper", Dean summons Death to kill him as he feels the Mark of Cain is corrupting him too much and he cannot fight it anymore. Death is unable to kill Dean because of the Mark's power and explains that the Mark was created to lock away an evil primordial entity known as the Darkness after God and the Archangels defeated it in a terrible war and that transferring the Mark to someone else is necessary to keep the Darkness bound. When Dean refuses to do this, he offers to transport Dean so far away he is no threat to anyone. However, he demands Sam's death in return as he fears Sam will try to rescue Dean and will not give up until he succeeds. Believing it to be for the greater good, Dean agrees and calls Sam to their location. Death tells Sam his reasons for wanting him dead, including Sam escaping him earlier. Death watches as Sam and Dean argue and fight and then Sam agrees to sacrifice himself to stop the threat of the Mark and the Darkness. Death gives Dean his scythe to do the job and tells him that if Dean does not kill Sam, he will. However, after being reminded of how good he really is and his love for his family, Dean instead impales Death with the scythe, killing him. Death can only stare at Dean in shock before crumbling to ash, leaving Dean stunned that he actually killed Death.

In "Out of the Darkness, Into the Fire", while talking with the Darkness, Dean mentions having learned about her from Death. The Darkness is confused by his statement, telling Dean that she does not know Death and he does not know her.

In "Form and Void", a Reaper named Billie confirms to Sam that Dean did kill Death. Billie states that while Death was amused by the Winchesters' cycle of death and resurrection, there is now a single rule: "what lives, dies." As a result, when the Winchesters eventually die, Billie will toss them into "the Empty" where nothing ever returns from to ensure they will remain dead.

In "Advanced Thanatology", Billie appears as the new Death. Billie reveals that one of the rules of the Universe is that when one incarnation of Death dies, it is replaced by the next Reaper who dies first. Having been killed by Castiel in "First Blood", Billie is now the new Death with her own ring and scythe and a new perspective on life and death. Billie continues this role until "Despair" when she is killed. Billie is briefly replaced as the new Death by Betty before Betty is killed by Lucifer.

Eleanor Visyak
Portrayed by Kim Johnston Ulrich, Eleanor Visyak is a creature from Purgatory who is over 900 years old. She was released from there on March 10, 1937, by a spell performed by H.P. Lovecraft. She possessed the body of his maid, Eleanor. She has been living as a professor of medieval studies at San Francisco University. She has a romantic past with Bobby Singer. In "Like a Virgin", at Bobby's suggestion, Dean visits Dr. Visyak to gain information about dragons and how to kill them. She has a dragon killing sword - the Sword of Brunswick (or Braunschweig) - in her basement, which is stuck in a large rock. Dean extracts it using plastic explosives, breaking the sword in the process. While visiting Westborough, the son of Eleanor, who saw his mother possessed by a creature from Purgatory in 1937, Bobby sees a photo of the woman and realizes that it is the woman he knows as Eleanor Visyak. He finds her in a cabin - one of her 'safe houses' - and tells her he knows who she really is. She confirms his suspicions, but denies that she killed H.P. Lovecraft. Bobby warns her that Castiel is looking for her. He asks for the information about how to open a door to Purgatory, but she refuses to tell him, and also rejects his offer of protection. As she leaves the cabin at the end of the episode, Castiel appears and takes her. A flashback of Sam's in the finale "The Man Who Knew Too Much" reveals that he, Bobby, and Dean found her, fatally wounded, in an alley. She recounts her tortured at the hands of Crowley and Castiel, and admits that she eventually gave in and revealed the spell to access to Purgatory, which involves the blood of a virgin and the blood of a creature from Purgatory. Eleanor dies before she can reveal where Crowley and Castiel are.

Eve
Eve, portrayed by Julia Maxwell and Samantha Smith, is also known as the "Mother of All". Eve was last on Earth 10,000 years ago. She is the original propagator of the majority of supernatural beings. She has been trapped in Purgatory, where the souls of the supernatural go. Eve is released from Purgatory in "Like a Virgin" by a sacrificial ritual. In "...And Then There Were None", Eve creates a being - referred to colloquially as the Khan Worm - that can enter a person's body through the ear and control their actions. She plants it inside a trucker, who goes on to kill his family. It then passes to one of his co-workers who kills 12 people. While investigating the murders, it infects Dean who kills his cousin Gwen, and then infects Samuel, and finally Bobby who kills Rufus while possessed. While possessing Bobby, it tells Dean and Sam that it was created by Eve, who intends for supernatural beings to take over the world. After acquiring the ashes of a Phoenix, said to be lethal to Eve, Sam, Dean, Bobby and Castiel take the fight to her in "Mommy Dearest". Eve reveals that her actions are purely a response to Crowley, still alive, and his capture and torture of her children. She speculates that he is after the souls in Purgatory, and claims that she was satisfied with the natural order of humans and monsters coexisting (with occasional bloodshed on both sides) until Crowley forced her hand. Eve dies after biting Dean, who had Phoenix ash in his blood, to which Crowley takes her body for autopsy. In "There Will Be Blood!", when the Leviathan Edgar is very dismissive towards the Alpha Vampire, he calls himself a "son of Eve", but Edgar calls the Alpha a "mutt" and Eve was "barely worth being called one of us." When Edgar calls Eve a whore, the Alpha Vampire is enraged and attacks him.

Dr. Hydeker
Dr. Hydeker, portrayed by Adrian Hough in his human form and Jeannie Epper in his real form, is a shtriga, a monster that feeds on the life force of children in Supernatural. Hydeker is immortal, superhumanly strong and fast and nearly invulnerable to harm with lore stating that shtriga cannot be killed any weapon forged by God or man. However, he is vulnerable to consecrated wrought-iron rounds when he is feeding. In his true form Hydeker appears as a gray-skinned humanoid figure in a cloak with long clawed fingers.

Hydeker's first known series of attacks were in Black River Falls, Wisconsin in 1893. Hydeker targeted dozens of children and worked as one of the doctors treating the mysterious illness, in reality the children's bodies wearing out due to their life force being drained which ultimately resulted in them dying after lingering for months. Every fifteen to twenty years, Hydeker would emerge again, feed on dozens of children and then disappear again. In around 1989, while active in Fort Douglas, Wisconsin, Hydeker was hunted by John Winchester. While John was out hunting and Dean was playing arcade games one night, Hydeker attempted to feed on the life force of a young Sam Winchester. John returned in time to drive Hydeker away. By the time John returned from dropping his children off at a friend's house for safety, Hydeker had vanished again.

In 2006, Hydeker resurfaced again in Fitchburg, Wisconsin. John got wind of Hydeker's return and sent his sons the coordinates, knowing that Dean considered killing the creature that had targeted his brother unfinished business. In his human disguise, Hydeker was once again the doctor treating the children who had fallen into comas from his feeding. After Hydeker fed on the life force of Asher, the son of a local motel owner, Sam went through newspaper records to discover how far back the shtriga attacks went and identified Hydeker as the culprit through a picture from 1893 of Hydeker standing around one of his victim's bed with a bunch of other doctors. To kill Hydeker, the Winchesters convinced Asher's older brother Michael to help, knowing that Hydeker would target him next. As Hydeker went to feed on Michael, the Winchesters entered the room and shot him several times, but he survived as he had not yet begun feeding. During the fight that followed, Hydeker began feeding on Sam, but Dean caught his attention and shot Hydeker in the head, killing him. Dean then emptied several more rounds into his body which crumbled to dust. The life force Hydeker drained returned to his victims and they all recovered. The morning following his death, Michael and Asher's mother noted that Hydeker had mysteriously not appeared at work, a fact that the Winchesters did not comment on.

Pestilence
Pestilence, portrayed by Matt Frewer, is one of the Four Horsemen of the Apocalypse, along with War, Famine and Death. He equates to the Green Horsemen, and wears an emerald-embedded ring. He can create and manipulate infestations, plagues, diseases, and other sicknesses.

Upon Lucifer's rise, Pestilence spreads Swine Flu on Earth. It is later revealed that the flu was spread to distribute the Croatoan Virus in the form of a 'vaccine'. Dean witnesses the effects of this when transported to the future by Zachariah - approximately 90% of the planet's population is infected. When the Winchesters track Pestilence, he is revealed to be vengeful for the defeat of War and Famine. Castiel defeats the Horseman by removing his ring and, with assistance from Crowley, the spread of the Croatoan Virus is prevented. The eventual fate of Pestilence is unknown, but it can be assumed that he survived his defeat, albeit much weakened.

Rowena MacLeod
Rowena MacLeod, portrayed by Ruth Connell, is a powerful witch and the mother of Fergus Rodrick MacLeod, who later became Crowley, the King of Hell. She claims to have conceived him during a winter orgy. During his childhood, she abused, attempted to sell, and eventually abandoned him. Originating from Scotland, she claims to be one of the few natural-born users of magic. She was once a part of the Grand Coven, but was expelled due to her violent and forceful tendencies.

In season 10, Rowena attempts to restore her power base by recruiting women into becoming witches of her own coven, having to face the Winchesters along the way. She joins up with Crowley, intending to exert her influence on her son, though with Dean's advice, Crowley eventually banishes her. Rowena and Crowley play a game of cat-and-mouse as they try to hunt each other down, but are forced to work together to release Dean from the Mark of Cain, a task only Rowena can accomplish. In the process, Rowena has to kill a Polish man named Oskar, the only person she truly cares for. After releasing the mark and unwittingly freeing The Darkness, Rowena escapes by turning Castiel against her son.

In season 11, still in the process of creating her coven, Rowena is asked by the Winchesters about a way to enter Lucifer's Cage in Hell, so they may find a way to stop the Darkness; while it is successful, Lucifer uses the opening to escape from the Cage. Enamored with the archangel, Rowena offers herself to join him, only to get herself killed once Lucifer confirms that she is the only one capable of sealing the Cage. Thanks to a spell she placed on her body, she is resurrected and vows to take revenge against Lucifer by teaming up with the Darkness, whose vessel she restores. Fearing for her power, Rowena bows out of the deal soon after and joins the Winchesters, Lucifer, Crowley and God in combating the Darkness.
 
In season 12, Rowena is asked by Crowley for help in finding Lucifer, who was incapacitated by the Darkness earlier and now possesses a rockstar's body. In "LOTUS", Rowena helps exorcise Lucifer out of the President of the United States and apparently send him back to the Cage.

In "Regarding Dean", Rowena is contacted by the Winchesters after Dean gets hit by a curse. Rowena recognizes the curse as one belonging to a family of druidic witches with whom she has a bad history and had believed she had wiped out. Rowena aids the Winchesters in killing the witches and breaks the curse on Dean, saving his life. While the Winchesters refuse to give Rowena the Black Grimoire, the family's spellbook, they promise they owe her "a little one." During the time Dean has no memory, Rowena tells him that she has had a change in perspective after witnessing the feud between God and The Darkness.

In "Family Feud", the Winchesters contact Rowena for help with finding her grandson, Gavin MacLeod who had been displaced to the present years before by Abaddon. Rowena aids the Winchesters in dealing with the situation by sending Gavin back to his own time to die against Crowley's wishes to set the timeline right. Rowena later tells Crowley that her actions were done to spite him for forcing her to kill Oskar in "Brother's Keeper".

In "All Along the Watchtower", the Winchesters attempt to contact Rowena for help in sealing Lucifer away once again only to learn that Lucifer has killed Rowena and burned her body to prevent resurrection. Both Lucifer and the Winchesters express a belief that Rowena is truly dead this time.

In "Various & Sundry Villains" Rowena returns as a result of the same precautionary spell as before, but has taken a longer time to heal because of the extent of her death. She's searching for the Black Grimoire because it contains a ritual that will allow her to remove the magical binding placed upon her by the Grand Coven and regain her full powers. She helps the Winchesters find the book after it has been taken by two sibling witches who hope to bring their dead mother back to life. They successfully get the book back and even though the Winchesters keep the book, Sam, sympathetic with what Rowena has gone through at Lucifer's hands, allows Rowena to take the page with the ritual she needs and Rowena restores her full powers.

In "Funeralia" Rowena begins killing humans along with their reapers before their time, altering fate to get the attention of Death, who she wishes to bring back her son, Crowley. The new Death, Billie, expresses sympathy towards her but refuses to bring back her son. Rowena wonders if she can be redeemed but agrees to help the Winchesters.

In "Unfinished Business", Rowena assists the Winchesters in finding Gabriel.

In "Beat the Devil", Rowena attempts to open up a rift to Apocalypse World, but the spell fails because the archangel grace provided by Gabriel is insufficient. Rowena and Gabriel debate why the spell failed and they proceed have sex. Rowena then works with Gabriel, Castiel and the Winchesters to capture Lucifer to use him as a generator of archangel grace for the spell. They then succeed in binding Lucifer and opening up the rift, but Rowena stays behind with Lucifer who taunts her, causing her to accidentally reveals that Lucifer's son, Jack, is in Apocalypse World. This motivates Lucifer to break free and enter the rift. Rowena considers running, but ultimately stays behind to keep the rift open without Lucifer's grace.

In "Exodus", Rowena uses the Black Grimoire to find a spell to keep the rift open. She manages to keep the rift open long enough for the Winchesters and their surviving allies to escape Apocalypse World without Lucifer. During the celebrations, Sam thanks Rowena for keeping the rift open long enough for everyone to escape, and she admits that she could not have kept it open any longer.

In "Let the Good Times Roll" it is revealed in a conversation between Mary and alternate Bobby that Rowena and the alternate version of Charlie Bradbury from Apocalypse World are "road-tripping it through the Southwest" together.

In "The Rupture", after Belphegor's betrayal means that all of the souls and demons won't be sealed in Hell, Rowena reveals that she knows of a spell that can draw the remaining souls and demons inside of her body and cast them into Hell. However, it requires the sacrifice of her own life. Rowena cuts out her resurrection charm so she can't come back and requests Sam stab her as all versions of her death have Sam kill her and Rowena can't bring herself to do it. Sam tearfully hugs Rowena and stabs her in the abdomen. Drawing all of the souls inside of herself, Rowena says a final goodbye to Sam and Dean before throwing herself into Hell, saving the world. Rowena's death leaves Sam and Dean greatly distraught, Sam in particular.

In "Our Father, Who Aren't In Heaven", the Winchesters are shocked to encounter Rowena when they venture into Hell in search of Michael. Rowena explains that after her death, she managed to seize control of Hell for herself and is now the Queen of Hell. Rowena sends her demons to find Michael for the Winchesters and reassures Sam that he did the right thing by killing her. Noticing tension between Dean and Castiel, Rowena urges them to make amends, noting her own many regrets from life. However, the demons discover that Michael is gone from Hell and the Winchesters and Castiel are forced to leave empty-handed.

In "Destiny's Child", Sam and Dean return to Hell in search of the Occultum and ask a demon to take them to Rowena. Much to the demon's obvious annoyance, Rowena now holds receptions for newly condemned souls arriving in Hell and has forbidden further demon deals from being made, resolved that people will go to Hell only on their own merits. However, the demon turns out to have been hired by Anael along with two others to assassinate the Winchesters. Sam and Dean kill the three demons and depart Hell without ever meeting with Rowena.

In The Winchesters
In "The Tears of a Clown", Ada Monroe encounters Rowena in 1972 while searching for magic that can stop the Akrida. Rowena offers to trade the magic for the demon that Ada had trapped in a plant, intending to torture it for information on Crowley and she taunts Ada into attacking her with magic. Afterwards, Rowena reveals that she was testing Ada's own magical abilities to see if she was worthy of joining Rowena's coven. Impressed, Rowena provides Ada with the magic that she needs to kill the Akrida Queen and informs her that the queen will need an upcoming planetary alignment to open her portal. However, the magic requires Ada to sacrifice a piece of her own soul to power it. Before leaving, Rowena tells Ada that she's more powerful than she knows and suggests that Ada look her up if she survives.

The Shadow
The Shadow, portrayed by Misha Collins, Erica Cerra and Rachel Miner, is the mysterious and powerful being inhabiting the Empty. Called the Shadow by Naomi, it is also referred to as a cosmic entity and the Empty itself by various characters.

In season 13's "The Big Empty", the Shadow is awoken when Castiel unexpectedly wakes up in the Empty. Taking on the form of Castiel himself but with a more sinister voice, the Shadow explains that it and the Empty predate everything and that not even God has power in its realm. It attempts to torment and threaten Castiel into compliance, but he continually refuses and demands that it resurrect him instead. After Castiel threatens to keep it awake for eternity until they both go insane, the Shadow reluctantly resurrects the angel. In "Tombstone", Castiel briefly mentions annoying "an ancient cosmic being" into sending him back to life, but subsequently attributes his resurrection to Jack.

In season 14's "Byzantium", the Shadow invades Heaven in search of Jack after the young Nephilim dies, feeling that he belongs in the Empty due to his half angel nature. The Shadow demonstrates its immense power by effortlessly blasting into Heaven, blowing open even the gates permanently sealed by Metatron years earlier and consuming the remaining angels. Secretly possessing the angel Dumah, the Shadow accompanies Castiel to Jack in Kelly Kline's Heaven where it reveals itself and attempts to take Jack with it. Receiving a prayer from Dean that they are ready to resurrect Jack, Castiel offers to trade himself for Jack to the Shadow, pointing out that it could be waiting eons for him otherwise. The Shadow accepts the deal, but warns that it will come to collect when Castiel is truly happy. The Shadow departs Dumah and Heaven and returns to the Empty, restoring all of the angels to normal.

In "Moriah", after being killed by God, Jack awakens in the Empty where he is greeted by the Shadow in its viscous humanoid form. The Shadow forms a smile on its face and appears to laugh at the confused Jack before Billie appears to tell Jack that they need to talk.

In season 15's "Destiny's Child", the Shadow takes on the form of Meg Masters when Castiel returns to the Empty in search of Ruby. Imitating many of the demon's mannerisms, the Shadow greets Castiel with Meg's trademark "Hello, Clarence", but is unable to collect on their deal as Castiel is not truly happy and it is working with Billie to stop God, having allowed Billie to resurrect Jack. Though annoyed, the Shadow reluctantly allows Castiel to converse with Ruby to find out the location of the Occultum. When Castiel prepares to leave, the Shadow explains that Billie has promised to send it back to sleep in exchange for the Shadow's help, something that the entity has been unable to do on its own since Castiel and Jack inadvertently woke it up two years before. Though the Shadow can't collect on their deal yet, it enjoys torturing Castiel while he is still within its power. After Jack takes Castiel out of the Empty, the amused Shadow simply comments that it will see him soon.

In "Unity", the Shadow, still in the form of Meg, is discovered by Sam inside of Death's Library searching for Billie. The Shadow explains that Castiel's visit to the Empty caused the being to doubt Billie's trustworthiness. To Sam's shock and horror, the Shadow reveals that Billie's true plan is to take power as the new God once Jack kills Amara and Chuck, leaving a power vacuum. For its help, Billie has promised to help the Shadow return to its slumber. Though the Shadow has located Chuck's book in the library, only Billie can read it. Sam convinces the Shadow that he is working for Billie and the being reluctantly turns the book over to him. During this time, its revealed that the Shadow can't come to Earth unless it is directly summoned there due to precautions put into place by Chuck.

In "Despair", to contain Jack's detonation, Billie teleports him into the Empty where he encounters the Shadow, still using Meg's form. The being is at first amused by his appearance until Jack explodes, engulfing them both. Both Jack and the Shadow survive, but after the being reforms, it is noticeably horrified and tells Jack that he made the usually silent Empty "loud", indicating that something has gone terribly wrong. At the same time, Billie confirms that the Shadow was telling the truth about her plans and that she really did lie to and manipulate the being. However, she feels safe on Earth as the Shadow can't come unless it is directly summoned. Billie eventually rescues Jack from the Empty after Sam returns Chuck's Death book, angering the Shadow who was causing Jack intense pain at the time. After being mortally wounded with her own scythe by Dean, Billie returns to her library which she has warded against the Shadow as a precaution. Later, Castiel realizes that the only way to stop Billie is to complete his deal with the Shadow which will summon it to take him. Castiel reveals his deal with the Shadow to Dean and completes it by confessing his love for Dean. The Shadow immediately opens a portal into the Empty in the bunker's dungeon and sends through two tendrils of darkness which absorb Castiel and Billie and pull them into the Empty.

In "Carry On", Bobby Singer reveals that Jack resurrected Castiel from the Empty again, freeing Castiel from the Shadow's clutches.

Sully
Sully, a zanna, is an imaginary friend of Sam's, created in response to a string of imaginary friend murders. Zanna are normally only visible to the children to whom they're assigned, and have certain charm capabilities and the power of teleportation and telepathy among themselves; however, they are vulnerable to spells that expose their presence.

Sam confided to Sully as a kid, and was almost convinced to leave behind his hunter family in pursuit of a monsterless life. However, Sam capriciously reversed course and exiled Sully.

After his breakup with Sam, Sully attempted to mentor two girls, Audrey and Reese, which ended in the melancholy accidental death of Audrey during a game of tag. Reese dedicated her life toward retribution, acquiring magic and special blades that could kill imaginary friends from witches, and systematically began attacking Sully's immediate friend circle, starting with Sparkle and Nicky Mermaid, and almost fatally wounding air guitar playing Weems.

When Sam and Dean intervene, Reese eventually forgives Sully, and Sam apologizes for dismissing him as a child.

Creatures

Deities
Deities are god-like beings of different cultures that are also known as pagan gods. The deities were powerful beings many years ago, gaining power from their human followers as well as from human sacrifices. Due to the arrival of the Abrahamic religions, many deities were weakened, resulting in them having to take human sacrifices themselves. Many deities act on their own accord, gathering power or human sacrifices for themselves.

In season one, Sam and Dean encounter the Vanir (performed by Mike Carpenter) in the episode "Scarecrow" where one of them appears as a scarecrow.

In season three, Sam and Dean encounter Madge and Edward Carrigan (portrayed by Merrilyn Gann and Spencer Garrett) in "A Very Supernatural Christmas" where they are pagan gods of the winter solstice from an unspecified culture.

In season five, Sam and Dean encounter a Leshi in "Fallen Idols" who assumes the form of Abraham Lincoln (portrayed by David Livingston), Mahatma Gandhi (portrayed by Paul Statman), and Paris Hilton. The episode "Hammer of the Gods" features the pagan gods Kali (portrayed by Rekha Sharma), Baldur (portrayed by Adam Croasdell), Mercury (portrayed by John Emmet Tracy), Odin (portrayed by Duncan Fraser), Ganesha (portrayed by Keith Dallas), Baron Samedi (portrayed by Precious Silburne), Zao Shen (portrayed by King Lau), Isis, and two unnamed pagan gods who hold a meeting at the Elysium Motel which they create while making a meal out of any human who checks in. Mercury poses as the desk clerk who does most of the creation of the Elysium Hotel, Isis poses as a waitress, and Zhao Shen is implied to work as the hotel chef due to him mostly being in the kitchen. Their meeting is to discuss what to do about the threat of Lucifer and the approaching apocalypse. Gabriel infiltrates the meeting passing himself off as Loki up to the point where Kali remembers him. Sam and Dean warn them that Lucifer will overwhelm them. The pagan gods are persuaded to release the remaining humans. When Lucifer arrives at the Elysium Motel upon being summoned by Mercury, he kills Mercury and the pagan gods until only Kali remains. She is evacuated by Sam and Dean while Gabriel fights Lucifer.

In season six, Sam and Dean encounter Veritas (portrayed by Serinda Swan) in "You Can't Handle the Truth."

In season seven, Sam and Dean encounter Osiris (portrayed by Faran Tahir) in "Defending Your Life." In "Time After Time", Sam and Dean encounter Chronos (portrayed by Jason Dohring).

In season eight, Sam and Dean encounter Plutus (portrayed by Gerard Plunkett) and Vili (portrayed by Alex Daikun) in "What's Up, Tiger Mommy?" while Plutus' assistant Beau (portrayed by Jonathan Walker) was exclusive to this show. The episode "Remember the Titans" had Sam and Dean encountering Zeus (portrayed by John Novak) and Artemis (portrayed by Anna Van Hooft) who were hunting Prometheus.

In season nine, Sam and Dean encounter Vesta (portrayed by Lindy Booth) in "Rock and a Hard Place."

In season ten, Sam and Dean encounter Calliope (portrayed by Hannah Levien) in "Fan Fiction" where she was interfering with a play adapted from Chuck Shurley's book by manifesting a copy of the Vanir's scarecrow form.

In season twelve, Sam and Dean encounter Moloch (portrayed by John DeSantis) in "The Memory Remains."

In season thirteen, Sam and Dean encounter Yokoth and Glythur in "The Thing" where they came from another reality. Both of them were killed by God. The episode "Unfinished Business" featured the real Loki (portrayed by Richard Speight Jr.) who had a history with Gabriel where he freed Loki from his imprisonment that Odin placed him in. Loki later double-crossed him and then went after Gabriel years later to exact revenge for what Lucifer did to Odin. Gabriel was able to slay Loki.

In season fourteen, Sam and Dean encounter Anubis (portrayed by Sean Amsing) in "Byzantium" who worked in Heaven and heard their tales.

In season fifteen, Sam and Dean encounter Fortuna (portrayed by Lynda Boyd) and her demigod son Pax (portrayed by Stephen Huszar) in "The Gamblers" where they learned the history of the pagan gods from Fortuna. It is revealed that God created the deities so humanity can blame them for his mistakes and that they also can make great stories.

Djinn
Djinn are a race of monsters appearing in Supernatural. Unlike common lore, they do not actually grant wishes, and instead put their victims into a dream-state where they play out a fantasy in their mind where their wish has come true while the djinn feeds off of them. Other djinn have shown the ability to instead place their victims in a sort of waking nightmare state where they hallucinate their worst fears before being killed. A bastard offshoot exists as well, feeding on fear instead of desire and instead of putting people into states where they imagine their greatest desire, they are put into a nightmare where they experience their worst fear. Both kinds of djinn, the regular djinn and the bastard offshoot can be killed by a silver knife dipped in lamb's blood. Regular djinn poison can be cured using an antidote developed by the Campbell family, but the antidote does not work on the bastard offshoot's poison. This is speculated to be because they are a different kind of djinn and need a different kind of antidote. Another way of saving a person under the influence of djinn poison is to wake them from their dream state which breaks the loop they are in and ends the effects of the poison.

In season 2's "What Is and What Should Never Be", the Winchesters hunt a djinn who apparently grants Dean's wish that his mother never died. As a result, Dean awakens in what is apparently an alternate reality where Mary Winchester is still alive, John Winchester died of natural causes years before, Sam is engaged to Jessica Moore and Dean is somewhat detached from his family though he has a beautiful girlfriend named Carmen Porter. While originally happy, Dean is distressed by his distance from his family and the discovery that the people the Winchesters saved died in the alternate reality without Sam and Dean there to save him. He is also haunted by visions of a young woman he found hanging in the djinn's lair. Dean decides to track down the djinn and reverse his wish, accompanied by a reluctant Sam. Upon arriving at the djinn's lair, Dean comes to the realization that he is not in an alternate reality after all but instead is in dream state while the djinn feeds on him. Despite his imagined family trying to convince him to stop, Dean commits suicide in the dream which awakens him in the real world where Sam finds him. Dean kills the djinn as it tries to put Sam into a similar state and they rescue the young woman, the djinn's other victim, who survives.

In the season 6 premiere "Exile on Main St.", Dean is targeted for revenge by three djinn a year after quitting hunting in revenge for the death of the djinn in "What Is and What Should Never Be" who they identify as their father. Posing as Dean's waitress, one of the djinn, Brigitta, poisons Dean who experiences intense hallucinations, ending with an attack by the long-dead Azazel. Dean is saved by Sam who injects Dean with an antidote. Sam, who Dean was unaware was still alive, explains that he was targeted by the djinn too and was saved by the Campbell family. To draw Dean out, the djinn attack and kill his neighbors then give him a "double dose" of poison, destroying the antidote. Sam manages to bash in the head of one of the male djinn with a golf club while the other is killed from behind by Samuel Campbell with a silver knife dipped in lamb's blood. Brigitta is captured by Samuel and Christian Campbell and taken to Crowley who tortures her for information on the Alpha Djinn. Brigitta is found by the Winchesters, Castiel and Meg Masters in "Caged Heat" where she begs them for help. Brigitta is killed by Castiel when he destroys the monster prison.

In season 8's "Pac-Man Fever", the Winchesters and Charlie Bradbury investigate a case of people who die with their insides turned to jelly and a strange blue handprint on their arm. Dean discovers from John Winchester's journal that the culprit is a bastard offshoot of djinn who are revealed to feed on fear rather than desire. The local coroner, Jennifer O'Brien, is revealed to be a djinn who has been using her job to cover up her murders for years by immediately cremating the bodies. Jennifer kidnaps Charlie and places her into a nightmare state where Charlie has to fight off an endless army of monsters to protect patients in a hospital, particularly her brain dead mother who losing is Charlie's greatest fear. Jennifer is found out by the Winchesters and killed by Dean. Unable to wake Charlie with the djinn antidote, Dean uses African dream root to enter her dream state where he manages to get her to let go of her fear and wake up. At the same time, Sam discovers that the most recent murders were committed by Jennifer's teenage son. Unaware of how to hide his kills and having just come of age, he drew too much attention with his actions. Despite being in a weakened state from the Hell Trials, Sam manages to kill the boy.

In season 9's "Bloodlines", djinn are revealed to be one of the Five Monster Families of Chicago. According to shapeshifter David Lassiter, the djinn control the South Side. A representative of the family meets with werewolf Julian Duval to forge an alliance in preparation for a possible war with the shapeshifter Lassiter family following the murder of family head Sal Lassiter by an insane hunter.

In season 13's "Scoobynatural", Castiel returns to the Men of Letters bunker with fruit from the Tree of Life. Castiel reveals that the Tree was guarded by a pack of djinn, most of whom Castiel killed before negotiating with the rest. Castiel notes that he thinks he is now technically married to the djinn queen.

In season 14's "Nightmare Logic", the Winchesters, their mother, Bobby Singer and another hunter named Maggie encounter a djinn named Neil who has been enhanced by Michael. Michael's enhancements allow Neil to tell a person's worst fears simply by touching them and bring the fears to life around them. Neil puts a home owner named Patrick Rawling into a coma, apparently as the result of a stroke and poses as Patrick's live-in nurse. While investigating the case, Dean recognizes the rig Neil is using to drain the home owner's blood as the same he was hooked up to by a djinn in "What Is and What Should Never Be" and confronts Neil who reveals that he was left as a trap for hunters by Michael while he was possessing Dean, resulting in Neil mistaking Dean for Michael when he arrived. After revealing that Michael has left similar traps all over, Neil attacks Dean who mysteriously proves immune to his powers. Lacking a silver knife dipped in lamb's blood, Dean bashes Neil's head in with a heavy metal bookend, killing him and then fires several more shots into his head, ending Neil's manifestations. As Neil's poison was what was keeping Patrick comatose, he recovers as well once Neil is dead and he is no longer under Neil's influence. Taking Neil's warning to heart, the Winchesters spread the word to other hunters about Michael's traps.

Ghosts
Ghosts are one of the most recurring monsters of the week on Supernatural, appearing at least once each season.

In the show, there are several different types of ghosts that appear including:

 Buruburu - A type of ghost that is born of fear and strikes people with the ghostly sickness. The episode "Yellow Fever" featured one made from the spirit of Luther Garland (portrayed by David Mattey) who was chained to a truck and dragged up and down a gravel road to death by Frank O'Brien. Sam and Bobby scared him to get him to rest since Buruburus can be defeated with fear.
 Death Echoes - A type of trapped ghost that reenacts their own death in a loop. In "Ghostfacers" Sam, Dean, and the Ghostfacers encountered Death Echoes of the people whose bodies were stolen by Freeman Daggett. Alan Corbett of the Ghostfacers became Daggett's latest victim.
 Death Omens - The Death Omens are an indicator where a person that is visited by it is going to die. They can manifest in different places at once. Isaiah Merchant (portrayed by Linden Banks) from "Provenance" was the first Death Omen that appeared after he was killed by his adoptive daughter Melanie. Claire Becker (portrayed by Shannon Powell) from "The Usual Suspects" is a Death Omen that was killed in life by Detective Peter Sheridan where she tried to warn people about his corruption. Espirito Santo is a ghost ship from "Red Sky at Morning" who appeared before anyone who murdered a member of their family. Cole Griffith (portrayed by Alexander Gould) from "Death Takes a Holiday" became a Death Omen to warn the Winchesters about the plot of Alastair and the Reapers. Leticia Gore (portrayed by Teagan Rae Avoledo) from "The Real Ghostbusters" was a Death Omen who tried to warn the Winchesters about the Ghost Orphans. Kate Fox (portrayed by Jennifer Koenig) from "The Mentalists" was a Death Omen who tried to warn people about the spirit of her sister Margaret killing them at the hands of Jimmy Tomorrow by giving them visions of their death. Victoria Dodd (portrayed by Elysia Rotaru) and Dexter O'Connell (portrayed by Derek Gilroy) from "Of Grave Importance" were Death Omens who tried to warn people about Whitman Van Ness. Lucas Kellinger (portrayed by Christian Convery) from "The Foundry" was a Death Omen that tried to warn people about the actions of Hugo Moriarty.
 Poltergeists - 
 Spectres - The ghosts of people who were evil in life.
 Vengeful Spirits - The ghosts of people who want revenge for a wrong committed to them in life. Mary Worthington (portrayed by Jovanna Burke) from "Bloody Mary" was the first vengeful spirit they encountered where she was originally killed by a surgeon named Trevor Sampson and was based on Bloody Mary.
 Violent Spirits - A type of dangerous ghost motivated by cruelty. The ghost of Jacob "Hookman" Karns (portrayed by Sean Millington) from "Hook Man" fed off the repressed emotions while murdering those he claimed had sinned. The ghost of Sanford Ellicott (portrayed by Norman Armour) from "Asylum" continued his barbaric experiments. The ghost of Melanie Merchant (portrayed by Jodelle Ferland) from "Provenance" haunted anyone who came in contact with her family's portrait. The ghost of serial killer Henry H Holmes (portrayed by Stephen Aberle) from "No Exit" continued killing people after his death. The ghost of the nurse Delores Glockner (portrayed by Andee Frizzell) from "Folsom Prison Blues" continued murdering people that entered her ward. The ghost of Freeman Daggett (portrayed by John DeSantis) from "Ghostfacers" killed people that entered his house on a leap year. The ghost of P.T. Sandover (portrayed by John Hainsworth) from "It's a Terrible Life" had his co-workers work hard to perfection and drive them to suicide if they fail. The Ghost Orphans (portrayed by Connor Stanhope, Connor Beardmore, and Luke Gail) from "The Real Ghostbusters" went on a rampage at a "Supernatural" convention. The ghost of Margaret Fox (portrayed by Mia Igimundson) from "The Mentalists" was used by Jimmy Tomorrow to kill fake psychics. The ghost of Whitman Van Ness (portrayed by Antonio Cupo) from "Of Grave Importance" had killed his fiancé and also bound the ghosts of his victims to his house as well as killing and binding anyone who entered the house. The ghost of Hugo Moriarty (portrayed by Cameron Grierson) from "The Foundry" killed any children that lived in his former house ever since the loss of his daughter. The ghost of Avery Meadows (portrayed by Sacha M. Romano) from "Advanced Thanatology" tracked down two boys who stole his doctor's mask. The ghost of John Wayne Gacy (portrayed by Chris Nowland in "Lebanon", Shaun Magee in "Moriah", Sean Tyson in "Back and to the Future") appears as a violent spirit and was found in his cigar box following Terry's death." The ghost of Francis Tumblety (portrayed by Lane Davies) was the person who operated as Jack the Ripper as revealed in "Raising Hell". The ghost of the witch Jacinda (portrayed by Alex Sturman) from "Golden Time" assisted her living relatives into reviving her after having been previously killed by Rowena.
 Women in White - Female ghosts in white clothes that kidnap men and children and are loosely based on La Llorona. Constance Welch (portrayed by Sarah Shahi in the pilot, Shanae Tomasevich in "Moriah" and season 15) is a known Woman in White who drowned her children in a bathtub after finding her husband Joseph cheating on her and committed suicide. She haunted the highways near her home and killed anyone who got close. When Sam and Dean drive the car into the house where she briefly attacks them, Constance is confronted by the ghost of her children and dragged into the afterlife.

During the show, numerous methods are employed to put the various ghosts to rest, but the most commonly used is salting and burning their human remains. Generally when a spirit's remains are salted and burned, they go up in flames. However, sometimes this is not possible due to cremation and they are attached to an object that must be salted and burned as well. Sam and Dean regularly use iron objects and rock salt shotgun pellets to battle ghosts as iron and salt repel them for a while.

In season 7, hunter Bobby Singer became a ghost for a time after his death to look after the Winchesters and help stop the Leviathan threat. When he began turning into a vengeful spirit, the Winchesters were forced to put him to rest.

While it was initially unknown where ghosts go after they are destroyed, hunters generally believed it to be oblivion. However, it is revealed in season 8's "Taxi Driver" that Reapers take the spirit to where they belong once the ghost has been forced from this plane of existence.

In season 9's "Captives" and "Stairway to Heaven", the ghost of Prophet Kevin Tran and the Reaper Tessa reveal that the closing of Heaven has trapped all of the ghosts who since died in the Veil.

This is rectified when Metatron is defeated and Heaven is reopened as seen in season 10's "Angel Heart" where the recently deceased Amelia Novak is reunited with her husband in Heaven. Additionally, the Winchesters are twice shown to convince a ghost to move on rather than forcing them to though they revert to their old method of dealing with ghosts in "Paint it Black." In the first instance in season 9's "Bad Boys", the ghost is attached to her young son rather than an object and the boy convinces her to go on. In the second instance, season 10's "Halt & Catch Fire", the ghost is haunting the Internet and there is no way to destroy him through usual methods. Instead, the man's wife convinces him over FaceTime to move on.

At the end of season 14, God opens every door in Hell and unleashes billions of condemned souls upon the world, some being old enemies of the Winchesters like Constance Welch, Mary Worthington, and John Wayne Gacy.

In the first three episodes of season 15, the Winchesters and their allies attempt to contain Constance Welch, Mary Worthington, John Wayne Gacy, Lizzie Borden's ghost, Francis Tumblety's ghost, and other unnamed Hell Ghosts to Harlan, Kansas where they emerged and find a way to send all of them back to Hell. Using a spell from the demon Belphegor, the Winchesters contain the ghosts for a time, but the barrier begins to fail. Belphegor proposes a plan to use Lilith's Crook, a magical horn created by Lilith, to draw all of the Hell Ghosts back into Hell while Rowena performs a spell to close the rupture. Castiel is forced to kill Belphegor after he betrays them and Rowena sacrifices herself to cast them back into Hell.

Leviathans
Leviathans were first introduced as another primary "creation" of God in the Season 7 premiere. According to Death, the Leviathans were among God's earliest creations but were sealed in Purgatory because they were a threat to His other creations. Castiel accidentally absorbs them, along with the souls in Purgatory, during his attempted apotheosis, and the Leviathans free themselves. Once free, they organize a hierarchy with the Leviathan possessing the businessman Richard "Dick" Roman as the leader, though Crowley claims that this being has always been their leader.

The Leviathans are portrayed as virtually indestructible, voracious, and stronger than demons and low-level angels. They can shape-shift into humans, but to do so, they must use traces of their DNA. Leviathans not only replicate the corporeal form of a human, but also their memories and skills. They also have the ability to kill angels with brute force alone. Leviathans' weaknesses include magic, borax, and decapitation, though none of these are lethal. One way for a Leviathan to die is for it to be eaten by a Leviathan. Late in season seven, the characters find a tablet containing the "Word of God" that reveals a Leviathan can be killed by using "a bone of a righteous mortal washed in the blood of the three fallen." When this happens, the Leviathan liquefies and explodes.

In season seven, the Leviathans, led by Roman, plan to turn humankind into a farmed, Leviathan food source. They intend to do so through chemically decreasing their intelligence via food adulterants and curing their diseases, including cancer. The Winchesters put a stop to this during the season finale, with Dean and Castiel killing Roman, which, as a side consequence, sends them to Purgatory. Killing Roman, the only Leviathan leader that there has ever been, severely weakens the Leviathans, as they are now directionless. According to Crowley, they will now be regular monsters, albeit ones that are much harder to kill. The remaining Leviathans heavily involved in the plan for humanity are slaughtered by Crowley and his army in the confusion, but Crowley indicates that there are more. By season 8, all the Leviathans' influence appears to have disappeared from the Earth though there are apparently some still out there as it is suggested in "Pac-Man Fever" that they are responsible for mysterious deaths.

Not all Leviathans may have escaped from Purgatory through Castiel, as four were seen there during Dean and Castiel's time in the realm, attacking them. Castiel indicates that there are even more and states that they are relentlessly hunting him. One of his last memories before escaping Purgatory is of Leviathans chasing him.

Chet
Chet (played by Sean Owen Roberts) is a Leviathan stationed at a credit card company. When a flagged alias that was registered by the Winchesters was used, Chet begins to hunt the Winchesters down, tracking them to their hotel room in Prosperity, Indiana. While he easily dominated the brothers, a witch that the Winchesters helped disabled Chet and allowed them to escape. Using copious amounts of chains, the brothers took Chet to Bobby Singer's to determine his weakness.

While the brothers attempted to stop a pair of Leviathan doppelgängers, Bobby attempted to find a way to kill or hurt Chet. Nothing worked, until a Borax cleaning product used by Sheriff Jody Mills upstairs dripped from the ceiling; the chemical was significantly more painful and corrosive than anything else used, which Bobby affirmed to be the most effective countermeasure to Leviathans, in tandem with decapitation as long as the head was kept away from the body. Ultimately Bobby decapitated Chet who had at that time assumed Bobby's own form to taunt him and had Sheriff Jody Mills drop his head into a river while he encased Chet's body in concrete.

Dick Roman
Dick Roman (played by James Patrick Stuart) is a billionaire businessman whose secret identity is that of the nameless leviathan leader. Shortly after they were unknowingly released by Castiel, the leviathans infiltrated human society, with their leader murdering and impersonating the real Dick Roman. Dick is shown to have a hatred of demons that exceeds even his feelings about humanity, rejecting the demon Crowley's (Mark Sheppard) offer to join forces with him and telling the current leader of Hell that he might wipe his kind from the Earth. In "How to Make Friends and Influence Monsters", Dick visits an experimental facility run by a leviathan impersonation of one Dr. Gaines, disappointed by the newspaper articles stemming from the drugs used, and makes him eat himself. When his henchmen capture Bobby, Dick attempts to stop the Winchesters' rescue attempt, fatally wounding Bobby on their escape. Dick is later revealed to be after something from archaeological digs, and assigns Charlie to break Frank's hard drive. Unknown to him, she cracks it, learns the truth about him and the rest of the Leviathans, and then teams up with the Winchesters to erase the drive and find out his plans. The Winchesters switch the item he was looking for with a Borax bomb that explodes in Dick's face. Realizing that Charlie betrayed him, he orders the building locked down and goes after her, but the Winchesters break in with the help of Bobby's ghost and Bobby holds Dick off long enough for Charlie and the Winchesters to escape. Dick has Edgar kidnap Kevin at the end of "Reading is Fundamental" and threatens Linda to get Kevin to translate the Word of God tablet in "There Will Be Blood". Dick correctly predicts that the Winchester brothers are planning to get the blood of the Alpha Vampire and of Crowley for the leviathan-killing bone described by the tablet; after sending Edgar on an ill-fated mission to kill the Alpha Vampire before the Winchesters can attain the alpha's blood, Dick summons and traps Crowley. Rather than kill the demon, however, Dick makes a deal with Crowley: in exchange for Crowley giving the Winchesters the wrong blood as part of a trap, the demons will get a free rein with humans in the world, excluding America, which is the place where the leviathans are currently targeting for its abundant food source. Foreseeing Crowley's betrayal, Dick also arranges for several decoys of himself positioned in Sucrocorp to fool the Winchesters into wasting the bone on a fake. However, Dean and Castiel ultimately find and confront Dick, whom Castiel is able to identify due to the brief time that the leviathans used him as their host. When the bone seemingly fails to work, Dick initially believes that he has won, only to find out that he himself has been tricked when Dean kills him with the real bone, sending him back to Purgatory. As an unintended consequence of using the bone, however, Dean and Castiel are pulled into Purgatory with him.

Dr. Gaines
Dr. J. Gaines (played by Cameron Bancroft) is a Leviathan using the surgeon's form, although his original form was taken from a young girl named Annie. Under orders from Edgar, he killed the real Dr. Gaines and took his identity. Gaines is responsible setting up a system of feeding on patients at Sioux Falls General, thereby reining in the Leviathans' indiscriminate feeding. Gaines also appears to be the one responsible for conducting the experiments on Sucrocorp, modifying food to make humans docile, dumb and hungry. Gaines is "bibbed", a form of punishment where he was forced to eat himself alive in a bib under Richard Roman's orders, since his experiments attracted the attention of the media.

Edgar
Edgar (played by Benito Martinez) is the first Leviathan introduced in the series, taking the form of a demolitions expert and working under orders from "the Leader" - which will be later revealed to be Dick Roman - sent to lead in those feeding indiscriminately and to kill Sam, Dean and Bobby when they interfered on his plans. After observing the new system for feeding developed at Sioux Falls General, he torches Bobby's house and confronts the Winchesters, breaking Dean's leg and knocking Sam unconscious. Dean crushes him with a car from Bobby's scrapyard, but he is later revealed to have been unharmed and continues to pursue the Winchesters and Bobby.

After that, Edgar still worked underground under Dick's order, supervising Sucrocorp project. When the clay tablet that contained the Word of God was stolen by the Winchesters. Dick ordered Edgar to stop them, so he took the form of the detective Collins (played by Eric Floyd) and searched for Kevin Tran, the teenager prophet destined to keep the word. After two Angels return Kevin to his mother's house, Edgar easily kills the two. He later helps Dick force Kevin Tran to translate the Word of God for them and tries to kill the Alpha Vampire. However, Sam decapitates him while he is distracted and as a result of his betrayal, the Alpha gives Sam and Dean his blood for the weapon they are creating. Edgar is left to the Alpha with a warning to keep his head away from the rest of his body.

Shapeshifters
Shapeshifters are one of the most commonly appearing monsters in Supernatural. While shapeshifter is a somewhat general term, members of the species have also been shown using it when discussing their species with others. In particular, shapeshifter David Lassiter called himself a shapeshifter to Ennis Ross in season 9's "Bloodlines" and proceeded to describe what it meant. Having a human appearance, they are able to shapeshift into whomever they like, living or dead and perfectly mimic their appearance. As seen on a few occasions, unlike most monsters, shapeshifters are not created through a person being turned but are in fact made through sexual reproduction with one shapeshifter parent and one regular human parent. Most shapeshifters shed their skin when changing appearances, but in season 9 a few were able to change form without shedding skin similar to the Alpha Shapeshifter, the very first shapeshifter. They are vulnerable to silver which burns them on contact and kills them when they are stabbed or shot through the heart with it. On camera, their eyes give off a glow referred to as a retinal flare which helps to identify them.

Unlike many monsters, shapeshifters are not hunger-based and instead retain human impulses and desires which they use their powers to act upon. As a result, shapeshifters that are evil consciously choose to be rather than because of some innate impulse. On a few occasions, a shapeshifter has turned out to commit a murder or murders originally attributed to ghosts due to their ability to mimic the dead making it seem like the ghosts of the people they impersonate have come back for revenge. While some shapeshifters simply cycle through different forms and never seem to settle on one particular look, others have been shown to have a preferred appearance that they use as their base form for when they are not impersonating someone. It is never made clear if this chosen base form is simply a preference for the shapeshifter or is in fact what they originally looked like. Shapeshifters do not appear to be able to sense others of their kind as the Winchesters encountered a shapeshifter in season 13 that could not tell that her ex-boyfriend, another shapeshifter, was impersonating one of her patients. She also could not tell which it was once she knew that he was.

A shapeshifter first appears in season 1's "Skin", Sam and Dean's first encounter with one over their entire hunting career. Having taken the form of Sam's college friend Zach, the shapeshifter had framed him for murdering his girlfriend and was targeting couples by taking on the form of one member while they were away and harming their partner. In the form of Dean, the shapeshifter attacked a SWAT team sent to apprehend it, effectively framing him for its crimes. In the end, Dean killed the shapeshifter with silver bullets to the heart as it tried to kill Sam. The Winchesters then used its body, still in Dean's form, to fake his death and exonerating Zach and everyone else the shapeshifter framed at the same time. The shapeshifter's crimes play an important role in the Winchesters' relationship with the law, particularly as Dean becomes wanted for them once he is revealed to still be alive.

Another shapeshifter appears in season 2's "Nightshifter" where it has been taking on the form of bank employees to commit robberies. It comes to the Winchesters' attention when former security guard Ronald Resnick shows them security footage which features the shapeshifter's retinal flare. An attempt by the Winchesters to foil its next robbery is interrupted when Ronald takes over the bank, believing it to be a "mandroid" with laser eyes. The shapeshifter ends up killing and impersonating several people while the situation escalates with Ronald being killed by a SWAT sniper and the FBI getting involved. In the end, Dean manages to kill the shapeshifter with a silver letter opener and the Winchesters escape, but with the FBI now after them.

In season 4's "Monster Movie", the Winchesters encounter an unnamed shapeshifter obsessed with old monster movies who takes on the form of Count Dracula (portrayed by Todd Stashwick), the Wolfman, and the Mummy complete with special effects, confusing them until Sam rips his ear off by accident and realizes its shapeshifter skin. The shapeshifter indicates that a life of rejection for his nature drove him insane and he found solace in old monster movies. Ultimately, the shapeshifter in the form of Dracula is killed with silver bullets by a waitress he had developed an infatuation with. Playing up the act until his rather dramatic death, the shapeshifter decides that "this is how the movie should end" and is satisfied with his end.

In season 6's "Two and a Half Men", Dean, recently returned to hunting, works with Sam and the Campbell Family on the case of abducted babies which turn out to be shapeshifter babies with their father chasing after them. The Winchesters rescue one of the shapeshifter children whom they dub Bobby John and kill his father, but come under attack by the Alpha Shapeshifter, the first shapeshifter and father of the entire species. The Alpha Shapeshifter easily withstands everything that is thrown at him, including a silver knife to the heart and escapes with Bobby John. The Alpha Shapeshifter returns in "Caged Heat" where he has been captured by the demon Crowley who tortures him for information on the location of Purgatory. When the Alpha Shapeshifter will not talk, Crowley kills him through decapitation. Its eventually revealed that the Mother of All Monsters, Eve, was instructing her "children" to build up armies of their species in retaliation for Crowley's search for Purgatory.

In season 9's "Blade Runners", Magnus uses a shapeshifter from his "zoo" as a distraction and it is quickly killed by Sam. Unlike previously encountered shapeshifters, this one could change seamlessly, similar to the Alpha Shapeshifter. Later, in "Bloodlines", one of the Five Monster Families in Chicago, the Lassiter Family, were shapeshifters. Following the murder of family head Sal Lassiter, the Winchesters work with a wannabe-hunter named Ennis and Sal's brother David to catch the culprit which turns out to be an insane hunter.

In season 10's "Ask Jeeves", the Winchesters are called to a house in Connecticut as the next of kin for their friend Bobby Singer who was left something by a wealthy heiress. While they are in the house, a series of murders begin, apparently committed by the ghosts of the heiress and her long-dead husband. The killer is revealed to be a shapeshifter when her shed skin is found. The shapeshifter turns out to be the maid, Olivia. Olivia was in fact the heiress' daughter through an affair with a shapeshifter. On a hunt, Bobby had killed the father and made the mother promise to keep Olivia locked up in exchange for sparing her. After her mother's death, Olivia escaped and sought revenge upon her greedy relatives. After a game of cat and mouse, Dean kills Olivia with a silver bullet from behind, but fires several more shots into her corpse, worrying Sam that Dean is being influenced by the Mark of Cain once again.

In season 12, a "nest" of eight shapeshifters are mentioned to have been hunted down and killed by Mary Winchester and British Men of Letters operative Arthur Ketch. Subsequently, in "Twigs & Twine & Tasha Banes", the pair are shown to have captured a shapeshifter which takes on the form of Mary and is tortured by Arthur. The torture greatly disturbs Mary to see.

In season 13's "The Big Empty", the Winchesters investigate a case with the Nephilim Jack of a man murdered by his dead wife. Originally they believe the wife to be a ghost and salt and burn her body, but discover more murders of people by deceased loved ones, all connected to a grief counselor named Mia Vallens whose patients are closed-lipped about how she helps them achieve peace. Sam discovers that Mia is a shapeshifter, but she is proven to be innocent of the murders. Instead, she uses her shapeshifting abilities to help people say goodbye to their loved ones for a final time, trying to do good in the world instead of evil. The true killer turns out to be Mia's ex-boyfriend Buddy who is also a shapeshifter and a psychopath who enjoys ruining the lives of people before he kills them. In a final confrontation, Buddy tries to kill Sam with Dean's gun, but Jack deflects the bullet with telekinesis. Sam quickly returns fire, killing Buddy. In the aftermath, Mia promises to deal with Buddy's body and is left alone by the Winchesters due to her benevolent nature.

In season 14's "Nihilism", a shapeshifter is among the monsters loyal to and upgraded by Michael that invades the bunker in search of their leader. Replacing a hunter he kills, the shapeshifter lets the other monsters in, but they are all disintegrated by Jack using the power of his soul.

In season 15's "The Heroes' Journey", a shapeshifter named Cutty runs a monster fight club that Sam and Dean discover after they have been reduced to normal people again by God. Cutty captures the Winchesters and attempts to pit them against the massive vampire Maul, but they are rescued by Garth. Garth blows up the club with C4, killing Cutty and all of the monsters inside apart from Maul.

Vampires
Vampires are Supernatural's most common monsters, appearing in every season except season 4. Supernatural's vampires differ greatly from common vampire lore, a fact that is pointed out in their first appearance by John Winchester. In Supernatural, vampires are not affected by crosses or garlic while sunlight hurts, but is not fatal to them. In addition, vampires cannot be killed through a stake to the heart. The primary method of killing a vampire is instead decapitation while dead man's blood—the blood of a dead person—acts as a poison and sedative to them, though it is not fatal in the long run. Their bloodlust is very real and like mythological vampires they are driven to feed on humans. They can reproduce by feeding a human their blood or directly introducing it to the person's bloodstream. According to Dean Winchester, the time it takes a person to turn depends on that particular person: sometimes it can be fast and sometimes it can be slower.

Unlike most monster species, vampires can occasionally be cured and reverted to their original human state. This cure requires the blood of the sire vampire and for the new vampire to have not drank even a single drop of blood or the cure is ineffective. As mentioned in season 13's "Breakdown", two other ingredients are garlic and sage. The cure is mentioned to make the recipient sick for a few days after it is taken. It was developed by the Campbell family of hunters at some point in the past and is referred to as "an old family recipe" by Samuel Campbell. After learning of the cure when its used on Dean, the Winchesters put it to use occasionally to save recently turned vampires who have not yet fed. While other hunters are generally unaware of the cure's existence or how to make it, the Winchesters have shared it with a few others while using it during hunts. However, use of the cure is rare as the requirements, specifically the need for the vampire not to have fed yet on even a single drop of blood, make it rare that a situation is encountered where using the cure is an option.

Vampires first appear in season 1's "Dead Man's Blood" where a group led by Kate (portrayed by Anne Openshaw) and Luther (portrayed by Warren Christie) attack and kill hunter Daniel Elkins and steal from him a legendary gun known as The Colt which is rumored to be able to kill anything. Elkins' murder draws the attention of the Winchesters and their father who was a friend of Elkins and had never told his sons about vampires as he had believed the species to be extinct. John leads his sons on a pursuit of Elkins' killers as he sees The Colt as their only way of killing Azazel. Sam and Dean rescue the vampires' human victims and disobey orders to come to their father's rescue during an ambush. John uses The Colt to kill the vampire leader Luther, proving the legendary gun's power while two vampires manage to escape.

In season 2's "Bloodlust", Sam and Dean encounter a nest of vegetarian vampires that feed only on animals and consist of Lenore (portrayed by Amber Benson), Eli (portrayed by Ty Olsson), Conrad, and Christina Flanagan (portrayed by Janeane Carltone). This nest is being hunted by ruthless hunter Gordon Walker who wants to exterminate the entire species due to his sister getting turned. Though Dean originally sides with Gordon, he changes his mind upon seeing Lenore resist her cravings for human blood. Instead, the Winchesters help the vampires to escape and make an enemy of Gordon in the process. Lenore later returns in season 6's "Mommy Dearest" where she reveals that the influence of the Mother of All Monsters Eve caused her nest to return to feeding on humans. After giving the hunters Eve's location, Lenore is killed by Castiel at her own request.

In season 3's "Fresh Blood", the Winchesters come up against a vampire named Dixon (portrayed by Matthew Humphreys) who is trying to create a new nest following the extermination of his old one by hunters and the loss of his daughter. At the same time, vampire hunter Gordon Walker attacks in hopes of killing Sam and is caught by Dixon who changes Gordon into a vampire. By the time the Winchesters track Dixon down, Gordon has killed his "new daughters" and escaped and a depressed Dixon asks to be killed. Using his new powers, Gordon tries to kill Sam, changing a young woman into a vampire as part of a trap. Dean kills the young woman with The Colt while Sam manages to decapitate Gordon with razor wire.

In season 5's "Free to Be You and Me", a vampire (portrayed by Ed Welch) makes a cameo appearance, hunted by Dean while he is hunting solo. Quipping "eat it, Twilight", Dean kills the vampire on the hood of the Impala.

In season 6's "Live Free or Twihard", the Winchesters hunt a nest of vampires which are targeting teenagers who are into vampires due to their portrayal in mainstream media. Over the course of the episode, which pokes fun at many popular vampire portrayals, Dean gets turned into a vampire himself and the soulless Sam lets him, something that later creates friction between them. Dean learns that the vampires, under the telepathic command of the Alpha Vampire, the very first vampire, are drastically increasing their numbers to build an army which the Alpha Vampire later confirms in "Family Matters." Dean slaughters the nest and gets the blood of his sire which is used in a concoction invented by the Campbell Family to cure him.

In season 7's "There Will Be Blood", the Winchesters come into conflict with vampires once again while going after the Alpha Vampire for his blood. During this time, they learn that the new Leviathan food additive which makes humans stoned and docile is also fatal to vampires. After the Winchesters convince the Alpha Vampire of this, he recognizes that the hunters and vampires have a common enemy at the moment and gives them his blood willingly.

Vampires play a major role in season 8, mainly through Dean's vampire friend Benny who has a recurring role. In "Blood Brothers", Dean helps Benny hunt down a nest of vampire pirates that Dean dubs "vampirates." The nest was what Benny had belonged to before changing to good and he seeks revenge upon them for killing him. Dean helps Benny wipe out the nest and get his revenge, though Benny is devastated to learn that the woman he loved was transformed into a vampire and became a monster. Subsequently, in "Citizen Fang", a rogue vampire named Desmond (portrayed by Chad Rook) causes trouble for Benny when he begins murdering people to try to get Benny to join him. Dean and Benny dispatch Desmond, but the incident causes further problems for Benny. Later in the season in "Freaks and Geeks", the Winchesters encounter a group of teenage hunters that are chasing vampires that supposedly killed their families. Their mentor Victor Rogers (portrayed by Adrian Hough) turns out to be working with the true culprit Seth (portrayed by Cole Vigue) and setting up fake targets for them to hunt. After dealing with the culprit and their mentor, the teens cure their latest target with the help of the Winchesters.

In season 9's "Devil May Care", a vampire (portrayed by Jaren Moore) makes a brief cameo when he is killed by hunter Tracy Bell before she is captured by demons working for Abaddon. Another vampire named Maurice (portrayed by Noel Johansen) makes a cameo in "Bloodlines" as the maître d' of a restaurant before an insane hunter arrives and begins killing monsters. Maurice later encounters wanna-be hunter Ennis Ross who shoots Maurice with silver bullets to no effect. Ennis is saved when Dean kills Maurice and explains to Ennis what he was. In "Alex Annie Alexis Ann", the Winchesters and Jody Mills come up against a nest of vampires led by Celia (portrayed by Ashley Crow) that has been using a young girl named Alex as a lure for eight years. After Alex runs away, she is saved from her "brother" by Jody who calls in the Winchesters. Jody later realizes that the "mother" of the vampire family lost her real daughter years before and kidnapped Alex to replace her. With the help of Alex, the Winchesters and Jody kill the vampires. Though Alex is turned, the Winchesters cure her and she is later adopted by Jody.

In season 10's "Hibbing 911", the Winchesters, Jody and Sheriff Donna Hanscum come up against a small group of vampires who feed on a person's entire body instead of just their blood. Their former leader turns out to be the local sheriff Len Cuse (portrayed by Fred Ewanuick) who, after growing a conscience, left to try to protect people instead. The sheriff is killed by the vampire Starr (portrayed by Morgan Taylor Campbell) when he refuses to rejoin them and the nest is wiped out by Dean and Donna. Dean hunts a nest of six vampires solo in "The Werther Project" to "take the edge off" of the Mark of Cain's influence on him. Later, in "Brother's Keeper", Dean hunts two vampires solo while under the influence of the Mark of Cain and having separated from Sam. Though he rescues one of their victims, his rash actions get another hunter killed and finally convince Dean that he has gone too far.

In season 11's "Don't You Forget About Me", Alex Jones is targeted for revenge by a man named Richard Beesome (portrayed by Ben Cotton) who she had lured to Celia's nest. The nest had drank the man before turning him, resulting in him killing his family in his bloodlust. The man turned the most popular boy in Alex's high school named Henry (portrayed by Jedidiah Goodacre), who pretended to be her boyfriend, to help him destroy Alex's life before killing her. Posing as a janitor, Richard killed Alex' math teacher and later capturing Jody Mills and Claire Novak upon ambushing him with Henry revealing his true colors to Alex while capturing her. Though the vampires almost succeed in killing Alex, Jody and Claire, the Winchesters come to the rescue. Dean beheads Richard while Sam subdues Henry and allows her and Claire to behead him.

In season 12, Mary Winchester hunts a nest in "First Blood" when her sons are missing. Later, vampires feature prominently in "The Raid." As part of their operations in America, the British Men of Letters launch Project V, an initiative to wipe out all of the vampires in America. Now armed with a new weapon called the Anti-Vamp Device or AVD, the operation has killed over two hundred vampires in the Midwest, leaving just eleven left alive in the Midwest. However, the operation draws the ire of the Alpha Vampire who leads a raid on the British compound to stop them from slaughtering his children. Most of the British operatives are killed, but Sam manages to kill the Alpha Vampire with The Colt with help from his mother and Mick Davies. The few surviving vampires subsequently flee. The attack succeeds in ending Project V however.

In season 13's "Wayward Sisters", Sheriff Donna Hansum is mentioned to have become an avid vampire hunter and to have "killed a lot of vampires." Subsequently, in "Breakdown", Donna and the Winchesters come up against a vampire named Marlon (portrayed by Steven Yaffee) while trying to rescue Donna's niece Wendy from a man who carves up people and sells their parts to monsters in an online auction. Marlon proves to be part of the operation, picking out targets for the operation. When he is caught, the Winchesters are unaware that Marlon is a vampire and leave him with Donna's boyfriend Officer Doug Stover. Marlon breaks free and transforms Doug into a vampire. Doug is quickly subdued by Dean while Marlon is kneecapped by Donna who forces him to reveal where Wendy and Sam have been taken before killing him. As Doug has not yet fed, Dean uses Marlon's blood to cure him. The experience traumatizes Doug who breaks up with Donna over it.

Werewolves
Werewolves are one of the most recurring types of monsters on Supernatural. In the earlier seasons, werewolves are generally just mentioned in regards to old hunts or wrongly suspected as a culprit, making only a single appearance in season 2. It is not until their second appearance in season 8 that werewolves emerge as a more common type of monster. Werewolves are people who can change their appearance to gain claws, fangs, fur and superhuman abilities. Unlike most common lore and portrayals, werewolves do not change completely into a wolf-like appearance or a bipedal wolf-like appearance in this show. In Supernatural, werewolves can be created both through being bitten and through sexual reproduction. Supernatural features two types:

 Regular werewolves are the type that the Winchesters hunted in their earlier years while purebloods are the type featured in the later seasons of the show. Regular werewolves have no control of themselves and run on pure instinct. They appear to change while sleeping and the person lacks any memory of their actions. Regular werewolves are bound to the full moon for their change.
 Pureblood werewolves, which are from generations closer to the Alpha Werewolf, the first werewolf, can control the change which can happen at any time. Unlike regular werewolves, purebloods remember what has happened when they have transformed and if they choose, can control themselves rather than running on instinct alone. They can control their cravings and survive by feasting on animal hearts rather than human hearts if they so choose.

Werewolves of both types can be killed by silver to the heart and it is generally believed that there is no cure for lycanthropy. John Winchester believed that killing the sire werewolf would cure anyone they turned, but this turned out to be false. Other hunters, including Bobby Singer, were aware of this and believed there to be no cure.

In season 12, a group known as the British Men of Letters developed an experimental cure using the live blood of the sire werewolf which member Mick Davies called plasma therapy. It has to be administered during the early stages of lycanthropy and the werewolf cannot have killed anyone. Also, the sire werewolf has to be alive when the blood is drawn, complicating matters even further. Prior to the episode, the cure had only ever worked on rodents and even then only a single test subject out of ten. Their one-human test subject died in agony, causing the organization to abandon work on the cure. During the episode "Ladies Drink Free", Claire Novak becomes the first ever cured werewolf and while the cure works, it is excruciatingly painful for her and appears to work over a protracted period of time.

In season 2's "Heart", the Winchesters hunt a werewolf in San Francisco and discover that Sam's new love interest Madison (portrayed by Emmanuelle Vaugier) is a werewolf. The Winchesters determine that Madison was bitten by another werewolf who has been targeting prostitutes a month before and set out to try to save her. Following a theory in their father's journal, Dean kills the sire werewolf, Madison's neighbor Glen, in hopes of severing the bloodline to cure her. However, while sleeping with Sam that night, Madison transforms and escapes. With all other hunters stating that there is no cure, including Bobby Singer, Madison has a reluctant Sam kill her to keep Madison from hurting anyone else.

Season 8's "Bitten" is portrayed as a found footage episode following three young college students after one of them, Michael, is bitten by a werewolf and transforms. Michael becomes a pureblood werewolf which the three learn by following the Winchesters around. As Michael fights his instincts which leads to him killing people, his girlfriend Kate tries to protect him while his best friend Brian seeks to become a werewolf himself to become stronger, something that Michael resists doing. Brian eventually identifies their professor as the werewolf who bit Michael and the professor confesses that after years of surviving on animals, he gave into his instincts and killed someone. Knowing hunters would come, he turned Michael as a scapegoat. Brian forces the professor to turn him and the professor is subsequently tracked down and killed by Sam and Dean. Before dying, he thanks them for freeing him from what he felt was a curse. Driven insane by the power he has gotten, Brian kills Michael and turns Kate to be with her. Instead, Kate kills Brian and compiles all of the footage he has been putting together into a movie to show the Winchesters that they were not always monsters and did not want to become what they did. The Winchesters decide to give Kate a chance and do not hunt her down.

In season 9's "Sharp Teeth", the Winchesters discover that their friend and fellow hunter Garth was bitten on a hunt and became a pureblood werewolf. Garth joined a pack of supposedly-friendly werewolves after marrying the daughter of their leader. While most of the werewolves, who prefer to be called lycanthropes, are harmless, a small part of the pack turns out be part of a cult worshipping the Norse god Fenrir who they believe will bring about werewolf domination of the Earth when Ragnarok comes. The cult, led by Garth's mother-in-law, kidnaps Sam, Garth and Garth's wife Bess to murder Garth and Bess and frame the murders on Sam to spur the rest of the pack to join them. After figuring out the truth with the help of the pack's leader, Dean rescues the three and single-handedly kills all of the cultists. The Winchesters leave the rest of the pack be due to their peaceful nature. Later, in "Bloodlines", the Duval Family of Chicago are one of the Five Monster Families in the city. According to shapeshifter David Lassiter, the werewolves control the Gold Coast. The murder of shapeshifter Sal Lassiter by what appears to be a werewolf nearly drives the families to war. However, the Winchesters, wannabe-hunter Ennis Ross, shapeshifter David Lassiter and his ex-girlfriend werewolf Violet Duval discover that the true culprit is an insane hunter and prevent the war.

In season 10's "Paper Moon", the werewolf Kate returns as a suspect following several murders committed by a werewolf. Having worked hard to control herself, Kate reveals that she turned her sister Tasha to save Tasha's life after a serious car accident. Tasha refused to follow Kate's way of thinking and instead began building her own pack that hunts people. The Winchesters easily kill Tasha's two pack mates while Kate, after seeing the monster that Tasha has become, kills her sister herself before leaving again.

In season 11's "Red Meat", the Winchesters take on a werewolf case in a national park to take a break from their conflict with the Darkness. Unknown to them, the helpful bartender is the pack leader and she directs them right into a trap. The Winchesters manage to kill two werewolves, but Sam is seriously wounded when one werewolf shoots him with his own gun. The Winchesters rescue a young couple, Corbin and Michelle and are unaware the Corbin has been bitten. Chased by the remaining werewolves and dealing with the seriously injured Sam and Michelle, Corbin suffocates Sam when Dean will not leave him behind, apparently killing Sam. Though devastated, Dean helps Corbin and Michelle escape to a hospital where Corbin subsequently transforms into a werewolf and kills a doctor. At the same time, Sam, who was only put into a near-death state, regains consciousness in time to kill the remaining two werewolves and use their truck to return to the Impala. Sam arrives at the hospital in time to save Dean from Corbin who has become intoxicated by his new power as a werewolf, forcing Sam to kill him.

In a flashback to 1980 in season 12's "Celebrating the Life of Asa Fox", Mary Winchester kills a werewolf she has history with in Canada, saving the life of a young Asa Fox. The incident inspires Asa to go on to become a legendary hunter. In "Ladies Drink Free", the British Men of Letters have been systematically attacking werewolves along with other American monsters, using sulphate gas and silver nitrate to wipe out entire packs. As a result, a pureblood werewolf named Justin, driven insane by loneliness after his peaceful pack was killed, turns a girl named Hayden Foster to be his mate, murdering her brother at the same time. The action draws the attention of British Men of Letters operative Mick Davies who calls in the Winchesters for help. After discovering that Hayden is a werewolf, Mick reluctantly kills her with a silver injection. In response, Justin turns young hunter Claire Novak to replace Hayden. Due to her emotional issues, Claire requests to be killed as she doesn't believe she can control herself, but the Winchesters instead decide to try an experimental cure created by the British Men of Letters to save her, a cure that has never worked on a human subject. As the Winchesters try to find Claire's sire, Justin attacks and abducts Claire, but the Winchesters and Mick follow him using a tracker implanted on Claire by Mick. During the scuffle that follows, Mick manages to draw Justin's live blood before killing him with a silver bullet, allowing the Winchesters to create the cure. Though Claire experiences excruciating agony, she becomes the first werewolf ever to be cured.

In season 13's "Wayward Sisters", Claire hunts a small werewolf pack who kidnapped a young girl. Disguised as a delivery person, Claire kills the pack and rescues the girl before being called by Jody Mills to help as the Winchesters have disappeared. Subsequently, in "Breakdown", a werewolf is shown to be part of Terrance Clegg's online auction and wins the bid for Sam Winchester's heart. However, he never gets it as Clegg is killed by Dean moments later. In "Let the Good Times Roll", a pack of three werewolves is hunted by the Winchesters, Castiel and the Nephilim Jack. Castiel ambushes one outside of their hideout as he tries to smoke a cigarette and kills the werewolf with his angel blade. As the other two argue about the Kardashians, the Winchesters and Jack enter. Jack immobilizes the werewolves using telekinesis and Sam and Dean kill them with silver bullets without a fight.

In season 14's "Gods and Monsters", Michael approaches a werewolf pack to get their help in forming an army of monsters to destroy humanity. The pack leader agrees to work with Michael who enhances the werewolves using angel grace. Subsequently, four enhanced werewolves attack Sam and Mary Winchester along with Bobby Singer in an old church. Owing to their enhancements, they are stronger and faster than ever and immune to silver. However, Sam discovers that they are still vulnerable to decapitation which allows him and the other hunters to kill the four enhanced werewolves.

Witches
Witches are magic users appearing throughout Supernatural. According to witch Rowena MacLeod, the Grand Coven classifies witches into three categories: The Naturals, the Borrowers and the Students. The Naturals are witches born with natural power and are rare, Borrowers are witches who gain their powers through demon deals while the Students are witches who learn either on their own or are taught by other witches, but lack innate power and do not get it from a demon. Owing to the nature of the source of their powers, Borrowers are condemned to Hell as they have sold their souls for power. On Supernatural, witches mainly act through hex bags, a small cloth bag full of ingredients that acts as a medium for their spells. As a result, destroying the hex bag is usually enough to break a spell. Witches also often carry spell books known as grimoires. Examples are the Book of the Damned and the Black Grimoire which play major roles in the later seasons of the show.

As they are human, witches can die with the weaker witches being able to be killed through simple mortal injuries though stronger witches tend to be invulnerable to normal methods of harm. In season 11's "Love Hurts", Dean notes that being stabbed with a knife would only slow down a powerful witch rather than kill her. On several other occasions, powerful witches have scoffed at the idea of bullets harming them. In the earlier seasons, witches are more often than not killed by demons they have been dealing with than the Winchesters themselves. In season 8's "Man's Best Friend With Benefits", the Winchesters succeed in using a witch-killing spell learned from Bobby Singer in season 7's "Shut Up, Doctor Phil", to kill a hostile witch, albeit with the help of a distraction from a friendly witch's familiar. However, in season 10's "About a Boy", the same spell fails when the potion part of it is destroyed by the witch. Instead, Dean kills her by burning her in her own oven. In "Brother's Keeper", Sam modifies the witch-killing spell to be contained in hollow-point bullets. These new bullets, dubbed witch-killing bullets, are extremely effective against witches, killing even the most powerful witches who scoffed at the idea of bullets harming them. Seeing their first successful use in season 11's "Love Hurts", the bullets are used by the Winchesters whenever they come up against a witch, generally ending with the witch or witches being killed through being shot with the bullets.

Wraiths
Wraiths are a series of monsters appearing in Supernatural that feed on brain fluids through a bone skewer that emerges on their wrist and is stabbed into the victim's head. Wraiths commonly target humans in mental hospitals, because no one will believe them if they say a monster is after them. Through their touch, they can dose their victims with high levels of dopamine and cause them to hallucinate which makes the victim even more delicious to the wraith in question. Though they appear human outwardly, in mirrors their true distorted appearance is visible. Wraiths are highly vulnerable to silver, which burns them badly. Unlike most monsters that are vulnerable to silver, they do not appear to need to be stabbed in the heart with silver to be killed by it.

In season 5's "Sam, Interrupted", the Winchesters are contacted by hunter Martin Creaser who is convinced that a monster is preying on patients in a mental hospital where Martin is institutionalized, framing the deaths as suicides. Martin is able to determine that they are dealing with a wraith whom the Winchesters unknowingly fall victim to, beginning to hallucinate due to the wraith's poison. Owing to their hallucinations, Sam assaults a doctor he believes to be the wraith with a silver-plated letter opener and nearly kills the man before Martin stops him after noticing the man's lack of reaction to being cut by the letter opener. Dean eventually discovers that the true wraith is the nurse who admitted them to the mental hospital, having taken the chance to infect them at the time. After Dean and Martin stop her from killing her next victim, the wraith goes after a restrained Sam and explains that psychiatric patients are more delectable to her. As the wraith prepares to kill Sam, Dean bursts in and manages to kill the wraith with a silver-plated letter opener to the heart. The wraith's death ends her effect on the Winchesters who quickly make their escape.

In season 6's "Mommy Dearest", wraith traits, particularly their bone skewer, are amongst the monster traits incorporated by Eve into her newest creation that Dean dubs Jefferson Starships.

In season 9's "Bloodlines", a wraith named Marv acts as a bodyguard to shapeshifter Sal Lassiter. When Ennis Ross gets angry when Sal is served first at an upscale restaurant, Marv steps in, but is stopped by Sal while Ennis notices Marv's distorted reflection in a mirror. During the attack on the VIP club by an insane hunter, the man kills Marv by slashing open his throat and chest with handmade silver claws. Ennis later tells the Winchesters about what he witnessed with Marv's face and Sam identifies him as a wraith and explains how mirrors and cameras can sometimes reveal a monster.

In season 12's "Somewhere Between Heaven and Hell", a wraith is amongst the monsters Dean kills with a wire-wrapped baseball bat while on a hunt assigned in secret by British Men of Letters operative Mick Davies.

In season 13's "Patience", the Winchesters are called by psychic Missouri Moseley after a monster starts targeting psychics. The case is investigated by Dean and Jody Mills who determine with Missouri's help that the culprit is a wraith. The wraith turns out to have gotten a taste for psychics after feeding on one in a mental hospital. After killing Missouri, the wraith targets her psychic granddaughter Patience Turner who manages to escape. The wraith later captures Patience who is located by Dean and Jody with the help of Patience's father James. As the group arrives, Patience experiences a premonition of the wraith killing them one by one and manages to warn each in time to prevent their deaths. After a struggle, Dean manages to kill the wraith by stabbing it in the side with Jody's silver knife.

Types of demons
Demons are corrupted human souls that have endured many years of torture in Hell. Demons are malevolent beings, returning to Earth to commit chaos and violence. Many commit chaos at their own accord, doing so because they find it fun. Some demons manipulate humans into causing chaos and events that will get their souls sent to Hell upon death.

White-eyed Demons
The top-tier demons are the white-eyed demons, and as the commanders-in-chief of the demonic host, submit only to Lucifer himself. They are supposedly the first original demons: Lilith is known to be the oldest and as stated by the showrunners, Alastair is the second-oldest demon in the show's existence. Lilith was able to shoot burning beams of light while Alastair could fight and defeat an angel. Alastair proves highly immune to Ruby's knife as he was unaffected if he's carves and twisted through the guts and was even immune to pure angel-smiting. Lilith on the other hand was hinted to be immune to holy water and proved highly resistant to Sam's psychic powers. The only thing that can trap a white-eyed demon is an old Enochian devil's trap. The only known white-eyed demons are Lilith and Alastair.

Yellow-eyed Demons
The Princes of Hell are the yellow-eyed demons and the demon army generals. They are considered to be the first generation of demons created by Lucifer. Yellow-eyed demons have yellow irises and possibly black pupils as well as white skleras. The Yellow-Eyed demon Azazel was established to be impervious to holy water. However, a devil's trap constructed of iron rails at the corners of which churches were stationed successfully trapped him. Azazel was killed by the colt in "All Hell Breaks Loose". Until season 12, Azazel was the only known demon with Yellow Eyes. Ramiel was unaffected by a demon-killing knife, an angel blade, devil's-trap bullets since he was naturally immune to devil's traps. Ramiel was killed by The Lance of Michael. Dagon had the power to kill and destroy angels. The fourth Prince of Hell, Asmodeus was the weakest of Lucifer's creations and was hinted to be the youngest of the yellow-eyed demons. Through the grace of the archangel Gabriel, Asmodeus became the strongest of the yellow-eyed demons. However, the archangel Gabriel was able to effortlessly destroy him. After the death of Asmodeus, the Princes of Hell were extinguished.

Red-eyed Demons
Red-eyed demons are known as crossroads demons. These demons make deals. It is not known whether black-eyed demons or red-eyed demons are more powerful. However, Hell's Hierarchy of demons gives the red-eyed demons a higher authority through their occupation to make deals with souls. Humans summon red-eyed demons at a crossroads to make a deal. Red-eyed demons seal their deal with a kiss. The person making the deal will benefit from the deal they made. Ten years after the deal, hellhounds kill the person who made the deal and their souls fall to Hell. Of the red-eyed demons, Crowley is the most powerful. Crowley became the King of Hell after the deaths of Lilith, Alastair and Azazel.

Black-eyed Demons
The most common and weakest of their species are the black-eyed demons. These demons serve as soldiers, thugs, henchmen and minions. The black-eyed demons are often portrayed as mindless drones. Their powers and abilities include flying via smoke form, superhuman strength, superhuman stamina, invulnerability, immortality, telekinesis, and possession. Their weaknesses are exorcism, holy water, iron, rock salt, devil's traps, hallowed ground, holy fire, palo santos, Ruby's knife, the first blade, deaths scythe, angel blades, Lance of Michael, and the Colt. Cain trained the first fallen and the first born demons, forming an elite army known as the Knights of Hell. The Knights of Hell are resistant to the ancient demon-killing knife of the Kurds and holy water, and can only be killed by the First Blade. The Knights were mostly wiped out by Cain in 1863 with the last two Knights, Abaddon and Cain, eventually being killed by Dean Winchester.

Demon Mutations
Demons mutations are very special demons, Samhain being the most special of said demon mutations. They're terrifyingly special, and they rank separately in the hierarchy of Hell, acting under Samhain, the Lord of the Dead, according to the writers. They don't have subordinates, unlike other demons, whose are black-eyed demons. Being special, they are not vulnerable to demon weaknesses. At least one of there was even capable of summoning ghosts and other undead, and said to be able to summon monsters. Demon mutations do not have to possess humans and can even materialize in the shape of a young girl to attract people nearby to kill them. So far, the only known demons of this type are Samhain,  the Seven Deadly Sins, and Acheri, as well as the Croatoan Virus.

Hell's Hierarchy of Demons
 White-eyed Demons - Second-in-command to Lucifer himself, since they are the Hell's demon chiefs of staff and the white-eyed demons serve him as representatives and enforcers.
 Lilith is known to be the first demon ever created (by Lucifer himself) and the Queen of the Crossroads. Lilith was trapped in Hell until 2007 when she was freed when the Devil's Gate was opened. She proceeds to break the seals to Lucifer's Cage until only one remains. Sam killed Lilith using the powers he gained from drinking demon blood. However, it turned out to be a trick, as Lilith's death was the final seal to opening Lucifer's Cage. This allows Lucifer to escape and set about beginning the Apocalypse.
 Alastair is hinted to be the second demon ever created, and serves as Hell's master torturer. Alastair is said to be ruthless when torturing souls, being so ruthless even the demons fear him. He works alongside Lilith in breaking the seals to Lucifer's Cage. He was killed by Sam who used his powers from drinking blood to smite Alastair.
 Whitish-eyed Demons - The only so far known whitish-eyed demon is Samhain. He is the Lord of the Dead. Samhain walks the Earth every 600 years. His rising is one of the 66 seals to Lucifer's Cage. He was risen in 2008 and, therefore, broke a seal to the Cage. He was exorcised back to Hell by Sam using his powers.
 Yellow-eyed Demons - The Princes of Hell are the demon army generals and they are said to be the next rightful rulers of Hell. As stated in the episode Stuck in the Middle (With You), they are said to be the oldest of the old demons and turned by Lucifer himself. For much of the series, Azazel was the only known demon of this type, while all other demons were depicted as having black or red eyes; until Azazel's proper name was known, characters referred to him simply as "the Yellow-Eyed Demon."
 Red-eyed Demons - The crossroads demons are the demon deal-makers. They make deals to buy a human soul in exchange for granting wishes, a standard deal that typically lasts for ten years. After the deal period has expired, this person is killed by a hellhound and his soul will go to hell unless the person can find a way to make a second bargain with the demon. To make a second bargain, however, the person must offer something more valuable than their soul.
 Black-eyed Demons - The most common demons are the soldiers, thugs, henchmen, minions and the masses. The black-eyed demons could be trained by powerful demons like Alastair to become powerful black-eyed demons, like Meg.

Other creatures

References

 
Lists of American drama television series characters
Lists of action television characters
Lists of fantasy television characters
Angels in popular culture